This is a partial list of unnumbered minor planets for principal provisional designations assigned during 16–30 September 2003. Since this period yielded a high number of provisional discoveries, it is further split into several standalone pages. , a total of 657 bodies remain unnumbered for this period. Objects for this year are listed on the following pages: A–E · F–G · H–L · M–R · Si · Sii · Siii · Siv · T · Ui · Uii · Uiii · Uiv · V · Wi · Wii and X–Y. Also see previous and next year.

S 

|- id="2003 SB443" bgcolor=#E9E9E9
| 0 ||  || MBA-M || 17.4 || 1.8 km || multiple || 2003–2020 || 22 Apr 2020 || 43 || align=left | Disc.: Spacewatch || 
|- id="2003 SC443" bgcolor=#fefefe
| 0 ||  || MBA-I || 18.1 || data-sort-value="0.71" | 710 m || multiple || 2003–2021 || 17 Jan 2021 || 78 || align=left | Disc.: SpacewatchAlt.: 2015 CD47 || 
|- id="2003 SD443" bgcolor=#fefefe
| 0 ||  || MBA-I || 17.94 || data-sort-value="0.77" | 770 m || multiple || 2003–2021 || 11 May 2021 || 96 || align=left | Disc.: SDSS || 
|- id="2003 SF443" bgcolor=#d6d6d6
| 0 ||  || MBA-O || 16.8 || 2.4 km || multiple || 2003–2021 || 06 Jan 2021 || 124 || align=left | Disc.: Spacewatch || 
|- id="2003 SH443" bgcolor=#fefefe
| 0 ||  || MBA-I || 17.6 || data-sort-value="0.90" | 900 m || multiple || 2003–2020 || 28 Jun 2020 || 70 || align=left | Disc.: Spacewatch || 
|- id="2003 SJ443" bgcolor=#d6d6d6
| 0 ||  || MBA-O || 16.49 || 2.8 km || multiple || 2003–2022 || 27 Jan 2022 || 102 || align=left | Disc.: Spacewatch || 
|- id="2003 SK443" bgcolor=#E9E9E9
| 0 ||  || MBA-M || 17.61 || 1.7 km || multiple || 2003–2021 || 04 Oct 2021 || 78 || align=left | Disc.: LPL/Spacewatch II || 
|- id="2003 SL443" bgcolor=#d6d6d6
| 0 ||  || MBA-O || 16.6 || 2.7 km || multiple || 2003–2019 || 08 Aug 2019 || 46 || align=left | Disc.: Spacewatch || 
|- id="2003 SN443" bgcolor=#fefefe
| 0 ||  || MBA-I || 18.3 || data-sort-value="0.65" | 650 m || multiple || 2003–2019 || 01 Sep 2019 || 106 || align=left | Disc.: Spacewatch || 
|- id="2003 SO443" bgcolor=#d6d6d6
| 0 ||  || MBA-O || 16.93 || 2.3 km || multiple || 2003–2021 || 26 Nov 2021 || 49 || align=left | Disc.: LPL/Spacewatch II || 
|- id="2003 SP443" bgcolor=#fefefe
| 0 ||  || MBA-I || 18.1 || data-sort-value="0.71" | 710 m || multiple || 2003–2018 || 05 Oct 2018 || 43 || align=left | Disc.: Spacewatch || 
|- id="2003 SQ443" bgcolor=#E9E9E9
| 0 ||  || MBA-M || 17.1 || 2.1 km || multiple || 2003–2020 || 21 Apr 2020 || 66 || align=left | Disc.: Spacewatch || 
|- id="2003 SR443" bgcolor=#E9E9E9
| 0 ||  || MBA-M || 17.65 || 1.2 km || multiple || 2003–2022 || 22 Jan 2022 || 65 || align=left | Disc.: Spacewatch || 
|- id="2003 SS443" bgcolor=#E9E9E9
| 0 ||  || MBA-M || 17.49 || 1.8 km || multiple || 2003–2021 || 04 Aug 2021 || 69 || align=left | Disc.: Spacewatch || 
|- id="2003 ST443" bgcolor=#E9E9E9
| 0 ||  || MBA-M || 17.7 || 1.6 km || multiple || 2003–2017 || 01 Sep 2017 || 42 || align=left | Disc.: LPL/Spacewatch II || 
|- id="2003 SU443" bgcolor=#fefefe
| 0 ||  || MBA-I || 18.6 || data-sort-value="0.57" | 570 m || multiple || 2003–2021 || 18 Jan 2021 || 49 || align=left | Disc.: Spacewatch || 
|- id="2003 SW443" bgcolor=#E9E9E9
| 0 ||  || MBA-M || 17.4 || 1.4 km || multiple || 2003–2020 || 15 Dec 2020 || 61 || align=left | Disc.: SDSS || 
|- id="2003 SX443" bgcolor=#fefefe
| 1 ||  || MBA-I || 18.3 || data-sort-value="0.65" | 650 m || multiple || 2003–2022 || 10 Jan 2022 || 55 || align=left | Disc.: LONEOS || 
|- id="2003 SY443" bgcolor=#fefefe
| 0 ||  || MBA-I || 18.41 || data-sort-value="0.62" | 620 m || multiple || 2003–2022 || 07 Jan 2022 || 71 || align=left | Disc.: SpacewatchAlt.: 2003 UZ342 || 
|- id="2003 SZ443" bgcolor=#E9E9E9
| 0 ||  || MBA-M || 17.60 || 1.3 km || multiple || 2003–2022 || 27 Jan 2022 || 76 || align=left | Disc.: LPL/Spacewatch II || 
|- id="2003 SB444" bgcolor=#d6d6d6
| 0 ||  || MBA-O || 17.1 || 2.1 km || multiple || 2003–2019 || 24 Oct 2019 || 64 || align=left | Disc.: SDSS || 
|- id="2003 SD444" bgcolor=#E9E9E9
| 0 ||  || MBA-M || 17.8 || 1.5 km || multiple || 2003–2020 || 25 May 2020 || 50 || align=left | Disc.: Spacewatch || 
|- id="2003 SE444" bgcolor=#fefefe
| 0 ||  || MBA-I || 18.30 || data-sort-value="0.65" | 650 m || multiple || 2003–2021 || 08 Sep 2021 || 73 || align=left | Disc.: Spacewatch || 
|- id="2003 SG444" bgcolor=#d6d6d6
| 0 ||  || MBA-O || 16.85 || 2.4 km || multiple || 2003–2022 || 10 Jan 2022 || 59 || align=left | Disc.: LPL/Spacewatch II || 
|- id="2003 SH444" bgcolor=#fefefe
| 0 ||  || MBA-I || 18.4 || data-sort-value="0.62" | 620 m || multiple || 2003–2021 || 18 Jan 2021 || 56 || align=left | Disc.: CINEOS || 
|- id="2003 SJ444" bgcolor=#E9E9E9
| 0 ||  || MBA-M || 17.2 || 1.1 km || multiple || 2003–2021 || 06 Jan 2021 || 94 || align=left | Disc.: NEAT || 
|- id="2003 SK444" bgcolor=#fefefe
| 2 ||  || MBA-I || 18.4 || data-sort-value="0.62" | 620 m || multiple || 2003–2017 || 24 Oct 2017 || 52 || align=left | Disc.: SpacewatchAlt.: 2010 NA142 || 
|- id="2003 SL444" bgcolor=#E9E9E9
| 0 ||  || MBA-M || 17.4 || 1.4 km || multiple || 2003–2020 || 11 Oct 2020 || 82 || align=left | Disc.: SpacewatchAlt.: 2010 JJ23 || 
|- id="2003 SN444" bgcolor=#fefefe
| 0 ||  || MBA-I || 17.3 || 1.0 km || multiple || 2003–2021 || 18 Jan 2021 || 76 || align=left | Disc.: SpacewatchAlt.: 2010 CT232 || 
|- id="2003 SQ444" bgcolor=#E9E9E9
| 0 ||  || MBA-M || 17.5 || 1.8 km || multiple || 2003–2017 || 17 Nov 2017 || 54 || align=left | Disc.: SDSS || 
|- id="2003 SU444" bgcolor=#E9E9E9
| 0 ||  || MBA-M || 17.59 || 1.7 km || multiple || 2003–2021 || 28 Oct 2021 || 130 || align=left | Disc.: Spacewatch || 
|- id="2003 SW444" bgcolor=#E9E9E9
| 1 ||  || MBA-M || 17.6 || data-sort-value="0.90" | 900 m || multiple || 2003–2021 || 04 Jan 2021 || 72 || align=left | Disc.: Spacewatch || 
|- id="2003 SX444" bgcolor=#fefefe
| 0 ||  || MBA-I || 18.95 || data-sort-value="0.48" | 480 m || multiple || 2003–2021 || 09 Nov 2021 || 87 || align=left | Disc.: Spacewatch || 
|- id="2003 SY444" bgcolor=#E9E9E9
| 0 ||  || MBA-M || 17.74 || 1.2 km || multiple || 2003–2021 || 02 Dec 2021 || 57 || align=left | Disc.: LPL/Spacewatch II || 
|- id="2003 SZ444" bgcolor=#E9E9E9
| 3 ||  || MBA-M || 19.1 || data-sort-value="0.45" | 450 m || multiple || 1995–2019 || 26 Sep 2019 || 63 || align=left | Disc.: LPL/Spacewatch II || 
|- id="2003 SA445" bgcolor=#fefefe
| 0 ||  || MBA-I || 18.7 || data-sort-value="0.54" | 540 m || multiple || 2003–2019 || 19 Sep 2019 || 60 || align=left | Disc.: Spacewatch || 
|- id="2003 SC445" bgcolor=#E9E9E9
| 0 ||  || MBA-M || 17.64 || 1.2 km || multiple || 2003–2022 || 26 Jan 2022 || 89 || align=left | Disc.: Spacewatch || 
|- id="2003 SD445" bgcolor=#fefefe
| 0 ||  || MBA-I || 19.0 || data-sort-value="0.47" | 470 m || multiple || 2003–2019 || 25 Sep 2019 || 59 || align=left | Disc.: LPL/Spacewatch II || 
|- id="2003 SE445" bgcolor=#fefefe
| 0 ||  || MBA-I || 18.4 || data-sort-value="0.62" | 620 m || multiple || 2003–2018 || 07 Mar 2018 || 39 || align=left | Disc.: Spacewatch || 
|- id="2003 SF445" bgcolor=#d6d6d6
| 0 ||  || MBA-O || 17.0 || 2.2 km || multiple || 2003–2019 || 31 Oct 2019 || 67 || align=left | Disc.: Spacewatch || 
|- id="2003 SG445" bgcolor=#E9E9E9
| 0 ||  || MBA-M || 17.98 || 1.4 km || multiple || 2003–2021 || 12 Aug 2021 || 38 || align=left | Disc.: SDSS || 
|- id="2003 SH445" bgcolor=#fefefe
| 0 ||  || MBA-I || 18.2 || data-sort-value="0.68" | 680 m || multiple || 2003–2020 || 21 Jul 2020 || 63 || align=left | Disc.: Spacewatch || 
|- id="2003 SJ445" bgcolor=#fefefe
| 0 ||  || MBA-I || 18.5 || data-sort-value="0.59" | 590 m || multiple || 2003–2018 || 07 Mar 2018 || 40 || align=left | Disc.: LONEOS || 
|- id="2003 SK445" bgcolor=#fefefe
| 0 ||  || MBA-I || 18.97 || data-sort-value="0.48" | 480 m || multiple || 2003–2021 || 01 Dec 2021 || 41 || align=left | Disc.: Spacewatch || 
|- id="2003 SL445" bgcolor=#d6d6d6
| 0 ||  || MBA-O || 16.33 || 3.0 km || multiple || 2000–2021 || 08 Dec 2021 || 97 || align=left | Disc.: Spacewatch || 
|- id="2003 SM445" bgcolor=#E9E9E9
| 0 ||  || MBA-M || 17.66 || 1.2 km || multiple || 2003–2022 || 27 Jan 2022 || 60 || align=left | Disc.: Spacewatch || 
|- id="2003 SO445" bgcolor=#E9E9E9
| 1 ||  || MBA-M || 18.03 || 1.4 km || multiple || 2003–2021 || 28 Sep 2021 || 50 || align=left | Disc.: Spacewatch || 
|- id="2003 SQ445" bgcolor=#E9E9E9
| 0 ||  || MBA-M || 17.92 || 1.5 km || multiple || 2003–2021 || 08 Sep 2021 || 65 || align=left | Disc.: Spacewatch || 
|- id="2003 SR445" bgcolor=#fefefe
| 0 ||  || MBA-I || 18.91 || data-sort-value="0.49" | 490 m || multiple || 2003–2021 || 14 Jun 2021 || 55 || align=left | Disc.: SpacewatchAlt.: 2006 RJ99 || 
|- id="2003 SS445" bgcolor=#fefefe
| 1 ||  || MBA-I || 19.0 || data-sort-value="0.47" | 470 m || multiple || 2003–2019 || 21 Oct 2019 || 69 || align=left | Disc.: Spacewatch || 
|- id="2003 ST445" bgcolor=#fefefe
| 1 ||  || MBA-I || 18.5 || data-sort-value="0.59" | 590 m || multiple || 2003–2017 || 20 Nov 2017 || 43 || align=left | Disc.: Spacewatch || 
|- id="2003 SW445" bgcolor=#d6d6d6
| 0 ||  || MBA-O || 15.9 || 3.7 km || multiple || 2003–2021 || 11 Jan 2021 || 78 || align=left | Disc.: SDSS || 
|- id="2003 SX445" bgcolor=#d6d6d6
| 0 ||  || MBA-O || 16.49 || 2.8 km || multiple || 2003–2022 || 07 Jan 2022 || 101 || align=left | Disc.: SpacewatchAlt.: 2010 BT119 || 
|- id="2003 SY445" bgcolor=#E9E9E9
| 0 ||  || MBA-M || 17.98 || 1.4 km || multiple || 2003–2021 || 13 Sep 2021 || 52 || align=left | Disc.: Spacewatch || 
|- id="2003 SZ445" bgcolor=#d6d6d6
| 0 ||  || MBA-O || 16.50 || 2.8 km || multiple || 2003–2022 || 10 Jan 2022 || 147 || align=left | Disc.: SpacewatchAlt.: 2010 CC47 || 
|- id="2003 SA446" bgcolor=#E9E9E9
| 0 ||  || MBA-M || 17.58 || 1.7 km || multiple || 2003–2021 || 11 Jul 2021 || 50 || align=left | Disc.: Spacewatch || 
|- id="2003 SB446" bgcolor=#d6d6d6
| 0 ||  || MBA-O || 17.0 || 2.2 km || multiple || 2003–2020 || 15 Oct 2020 || 56 || align=left | Disc.: Spacewatch || 
|- id="2003 SC446" bgcolor=#fefefe
| 0 ||  || MBA-I || 18.41 || data-sort-value="0.62" | 620 m || multiple || 2003–2021 || 09 Jul 2021 || 55 || align=left | Disc.: SDSS || 
|- id="2003 SD446" bgcolor=#fefefe
| 3 ||  || MBA-I || 18.4 || data-sort-value="0.62" | 620 m || multiple || 2003–2017 || 24 Oct 2017 || 40 || align=left | Disc.: Spacewatch || 
|- id="2003 SE446" bgcolor=#fefefe
| 0 ||  || MBA-I || 18.6 || data-sort-value="0.57" | 570 m || multiple || 2003–2020 || 11 Oct 2020 || 67 || align=left | Disc.: Spacewatch || 
|- id="2003 SF446" bgcolor=#fefefe
| 1 ||  || MBA-I || 18.1 || data-sort-value="0.71" | 710 m || multiple || 2003–2015 || 08 Dec 2015 || 39 || align=left | Disc.: Spacewatch || 
|- id="2003 SG446" bgcolor=#d6d6d6
| 0 ||  || MBA-O || 16.5 || 2.8 km || multiple || 2003–2019 || 21 Oct 2019 || 62 || align=left | Disc.: LPL/Spacewatch II || 
|- id="2003 SH446" bgcolor=#fefefe
| 1 ||  || MBA-I || 19.00 || data-sort-value="0.47" | 470 m || multiple || 2003–2022 || 25 Jan 2022 || 47 || align=left | Disc.: Spacewatch || 
|- id="2003 SJ446" bgcolor=#fefefe
| 1 ||  || MBA-I || 18.99 || data-sort-value="0.47" | 470 m || multiple || 2003–2022 || 25 Jan 2022 || 49 || align=left | Disc.: LPL/Spacewatch II || 
|- id="2003 SK446" bgcolor=#E9E9E9
| 0 ||  || MBA-M || 18.2 || data-sort-value="0.68" | 680 m || multiple || 2003–2021 || 18 Jan 2021 || 56 || align=left | Disc.: Spacewatch || 
|- id="2003 SN446" bgcolor=#E9E9E9
| 0 ||  || MBA-M || 18.00 || 1.1 km || multiple || 2003–2022 || 25 Jan 2022 || 53 || align=left | Disc.: LPL/Spacewatch II || 
|- id="2003 SO446" bgcolor=#E9E9E9
| 0 ||  || MBA-M || 17.3 || 1.9 km || multiple || 2003–2020 || 21 Apr 2020 || 43 || align=left | Disc.: Spacewatch || 
|- id="2003 SP446" bgcolor=#fefefe
| 0 ||  || MBA-I || 19.0 || data-sort-value="0.47" | 470 m || multiple || 2003–2021 || 18 Jan 2021 || 44 || align=left | Disc.: Spacewatch || 
|- id="2003 SQ446" bgcolor=#fefefe
| 0 ||  || HUN || 18.4 || data-sort-value="0.62" | 620 m || multiple || 2003–2020 || 27 Jan 2020 || 75 || align=left | Disc.: Spacewatch || 
|- id="2003 SR446" bgcolor=#fefefe
| 1 ||  || MBA-I || 18.7 || data-sort-value="0.54" | 540 m || multiple || 2003–2020 || 12 Dec 2020 || 39 || align=left | Disc.: Spacewatch || 
|- id="2003 SS446" bgcolor=#fefefe
| 0 ||  || MBA-I || 18.44 || data-sort-value="0.61" | 610 m || multiple || 2003–2020 || 17 Nov 2020 || 50 || align=left | Disc.: Spacewatch || 
|- id="2003 SU446" bgcolor=#fefefe
| 0 ||  || MBA-I || 18.50 || data-sort-value="0.59" | 590 m || multiple || 1999–2021 || 05 Jul 2021 || 41 || align=left | Disc.: Spacewatch || 
|- id="2003 SW446" bgcolor=#E9E9E9
| 0 ||  || MBA-M || 18.51 || data-sort-value="0.83" | 830 m || multiple || 2003–2022 || 27 Jan 2022 || 46 || align=left | Disc.: Spacewatch || 
|- id="2003 SX446" bgcolor=#fefefe
| 1 ||  || HUN || 18.8 || data-sort-value="0.52" | 520 m || multiple || 2003–2018 || 06 Jan 2018 || 36 || align=left | Disc.: Spacewatch || 
|- id="2003 SY446" bgcolor=#fefefe
| 0 ||  || MBA-I || 18.77 || data-sort-value="0.52" | 520 m || multiple || 2003–2021 || 02 Dec 2021 || 67 || align=left | Disc.: Spacewatch || 
|- id="2003 SZ446" bgcolor=#E9E9E9
| 0 ||  || MBA-M || 17.77 || 1.6 km || multiple || 2003–2021 || 14 Aug 2021 || 51 || align=left | Disc.: Spacewatch || 
|- id="2003 SA447" bgcolor=#fefefe
| 1 ||  || MBA-I || 18.2 || data-sort-value="0.68" | 680 m || multiple || 1996–2020 || 10 Oct 2020 || 92 || align=left | Disc.: Spacewatch || 
|- id="2003 SB447" bgcolor=#E9E9E9
| 0 ||  || MBA-M || 18.5 || data-sort-value="0.84" | 840 m || multiple || 2003–2020 || 17 Jul 2020 || 39 || align=left | Disc.: Spacewatch || 
|- id="2003 SC447" bgcolor=#fefefe
| 1 ||  || MBA-I || 18.8 || data-sort-value="0.52" | 520 m || multiple || 2003–2017 || 27 Apr 2017 || 38 || align=left | Disc.: Spacewatch || 
|- id="2003 SD447" bgcolor=#d6d6d6
| 0 ||  || MBA-O || 17.20 || 2.0 km || multiple || 1995–2021 || 12 May 2021 || 65 || align=left | Disc.: SpacewatchAlt.: 2010 GM22 || 
|- id="2003 SE447" bgcolor=#fefefe
| 0 ||  || MBA-I || 18.4 || data-sort-value="0.62" | 620 m || multiple || 2003–2021 || 06 Jan 2021 || 89 || align=left | Disc.: Spacewatch || 
|- id="2003 SF447" bgcolor=#E9E9E9
| 0 ||  || MBA-M || 18.40 || data-sort-value="0.88" | 880 m || multiple || 2003–2022 || 12 Jan 2022 || 53 || align=left | Disc.: Spacewatch || 
|- id="2003 SG447" bgcolor=#E9E9E9
| 0 ||  || MBA-M || 17.79 || 1.5 km || multiple || 2003–2021 || 10 Sep 2021 || 67 || align=left | Disc.: Spacewatch || 
|- id="2003 SH447" bgcolor=#fefefe
| 0 ||  || MBA-I || 18.99 || data-sort-value="0.47" | 470 m || multiple || 2003–2021 || 09 Dec 2021 || 74 || align=left | Disc.: Spacewatch || 
|- id="2003 SJ447" bgcolor=#fefefe
| 1 ||  || MBA-I || 18.7 || data-sort-value="0.54" | 540 m || multiple || 2003–2020 || 17 Nov 2020 || 48 || align=left | Disc.: Spacewatch || 
|- id="2003 SK447" bgcolor=#d6d6d6
| 0 ||  || MBA-O || 17.4 || 1.8 km || multiple || 2003–2017 || 11 Aug 2017 || 33 || align=left | Disc.: Spacewatch || 
|- id="2003 SL447" bgcolor=#d6d6d6
| 0 ||  || MBA-O || 17.24 || 2.0 km || multiple || 2003–2022 || 27 Jan 2022 || 93 || align=left | Disc.: NEATAlt.: 2010 CY186 || 
|- id="2003 SM447" bgcolor=#fefefe
| 0 ||  || MBA-I || 19.0 || data-sort-value="0.47" | 470 m || multiple || 2003–2020 || 20 Oct 2020 || 75 || align=left | Disc.: Spacewatch || 
|- id="2003 SN447" bgcolor=#E9E9E9
| 1 ||  || MBA-M || 17.2 || 2.0 km || multiple || 2003–2020 || 19 Apr 2020 || 38 || align=left | Disc.: Spacewatch || 
|- id="2003 SO447" bgcolor=#fefefe
| 0 ||  || MBA-I || 19.0 || data-sort-value="0.47" | 470 m || multiple || 2003–2021 || 18 Jan 2021 || 34 || align=left | Disc.: Spacewatch || 
|- id="2003 SP447" bgcolor=#E9E9E9
| 0 ||  || MBA-M || 17.44 || 1.8 km || multiple || 2003–2021 || 08 Nov 2021 || 44 || align=left | Disc.: Spacewatch || 
|- id="2003 SQ447" bgcolor=#E9E9E9
| 0 ||  || MBA-M || 17.65 || 1.6 km || multiple || 2003–2021 || 09 Jul 2021 || 38 || align=left | Disc.: Spacewatch || 
|- id="2003 SR447" bgcolor=#fefefe
| 2 ||  || MBA-I || 19.1 || data-sort-value="0.45" | 450 m || multiple || 1996–2017 || 10 Nov 2017 || 34 || align=left | Disc.: Spacewatch || 
|- id="2003 SS447" bgcolor=#E9E9E9
| 1 ||  || MBA-M || 18.21 || 1.3 km || multiple || 2003–2021 || 14 Nov 2021 || 72 || align=left | Disc.: Spacewatch || 
|- id="2003 ST447" bgcolor=#E9E9E9
| 0 ||  || MBA-M || 18.44 || data-sort-value="0.86" | 860 m || multiple || 2003–2022 || 26 Jan 2022 || 55 || align=left | Disc.: NEAT || 
|- id="2003 SV447" bgcolor=#fefefe
| 1 ||  || MBA-I || 19.3 || data-sort-value="0.41" | 410 m || multiple || 2003–2016 || 04 Oct 2016 || 35 || align=left | Disc.: LPL/Spacewatch II || 
|- id="2003 SW447" bgcolor=#E9E9E9
| 0 ||  || MBA-M || 17.79 || 1.5 km || multiple || 2003–2021 || 28 Nov 2021 || 80 || align=left | Disc.: LPL/Spacewatch II || 
|- id="2003 SX447" bgcolor=#d6d6d6
| 0 ||  || MBA-O || 17.60 || 1.7 km || multiple || 2003–2022 || 25 Jan 2022 || 51 || align=left | Disc.: Spacewatch || 
|- id="2003 SY447" bgcolor=#fefefe
| 0 ||  || MBA-I || 19.20 || data-sort-value="0.43" | 430 m || multiple || 2003–2021 || 29 Nov 2021 || 60 || align=left | Disc.: Spacewatch || 
|- id="2003 SZ447" bgcolor=#E9E9E9
| 0 ||  || MBA-M || 18.0 || 1.1 km || multiple || 2003–2020 || 17 Dec 2020 || 63 || align=left | Disc.: Spacewatch || 
|- id="2003 SA448" bgcolor=#FA8072
| 1 ||  || MCA || 19.6 || data-sort-value="0.36" | 360 m || multiple || 2003–2019 || 24 Apr 2019 || 29 || align=left | Disc.: SDSS || 
|- id="2003 SB448" bgcolor=#d6d6d6
| 0 ||  || MBA-O || 16.9 || 2.3 km || multiple || 2003–2020 || 16 Nov 2020 || 48 || align=left | Disc.: SDSS || 
|- id="2003 SC448" bgcolor=#fefefe
| 0 ||  || MBA-I || 19.1 || data-sort-value="0.45" | 450 m || multiple || 2003–2020 || 24 Jun 2020 || 71 || align=left | Disc.: SDSS || 
|- id="2003 SD448" bgcolor=#E9E9E9
| 1 ||  || MBA-M || 19.2 || data-sort-value="0.43" | 430 m || multiple || 2003–2015 || 10 Oct 2015 || 28 || align=left | Disc.: Spacewatch || 
|- id="2003 SF448" bgcolor=#E9E9E9
| 3 ||  || MBA-M || 18.6 || data-sort-value="0.57" | 570 m || multiple || 2003–2019 || 01 Nov 2019 || 61 || align=left | Disc.: Spacewatch || 
|- id="2003 SG448" bgcolor=#E9E9E9
| 0 ||  || MBA-M || 17.63 || 1.3 km || multiple || 2003–2022 || 05 Jan 2022 || 75 || align=left | Disc.: Spacewatch || 
|- id="2003 SJ448" bgcolor=#E9E9E9
| 2 ||  || MBA-M || 19.3 || data-sort-value="0.41" | 410 m || multiple || 2003–2019 || 24 Aug 2019 || 35 || align=left | Disc.: Spacewatch || 
|- id="2003 SK448" bgcolor=#E9E9E9
| 0 ||  || MBA-M || 17.6 || data-sort-value="0.90" | 900 m || multiple || 2003–2017 || 02 Feb 2017 || 32 || align=left | Disc.: SDSS || 
|- id="2003 SL448" bgcolor=#E9E9E9
| 1 ||  || MBA-M || 18.3 || data-sort-value="0.65" | 650 m || multiple || 2003–2020 || 11 Dec 2020 || 29 || align=left | Disc.: Spacewatch || 
|- id="2003 SM448" bgcolor=#d6d6d6
| 0 ||  || MBA-O || 16.7 || 2.5 km || multiple || 2003–2021 || 02 Jan 2021 || 83 || align=left | Disc.: SpacewatchAlt.: 2016 BT31 || 
|- id="2003 SN448" bgcolor=#fefefe
| 0 ||  || MBA-I || 18.32 || data-sort-value="0.64" | 640 m || multiple || 2003–2021 || 30 Sep 2021 || 63 || align=left | Disc.: SDSSAlt.: 2016 BZ22 || 
|- id="2003 SO448" bgcolor=#E9E9E9
| 0 ||  || MBA-M || 18.3 || data-sort-value="0.92" | 920 m || multiple || 2003–2020 || 21 Oct 2020 || 62 || align=left | Disc.: Spacewatch || 
|- id="2003 SP448" bgcolor=#fefefe
| 0 ||  || HUN || 18.75 || data-sort-value="0.53" | 530 m || multiple || 2003–2021 || 06 Dec 2021 || 56 || align=left | Disc.: Spacewatch || 
|- id="2003 SQ448" bgcolor=#d6d6d6
| 0 ||  || MBA-O || 17.3 || 1.9 km || multiple || 2003–2019 || 26 Sep 2019 || 57 || align=left | Disc.: Spacewatch || 
|- id="2003 SR448" bgcolor=#E9E9E9
| 1 ||  || MBA-M || 17.3 || 1.0 km || multiple || 2003–2020 || 30 Oct 2020 || 34 || align=left | Disc.: Spacewatch || 
|- id="2003 SS448" bgcolor=#fefefe
| 0 ||  || HUN || 18.5 || data-sort-value="0.59" | 590 m || multiple || 2003–2019 || 29 Jul 2019 || 49 || align=left | Disc.: Spacewatch || 
|- id="2003 ST448" bgcolor=#fefefe
| 1 ||  || MBA-I || 18.3 || data-sort-value="0.65" | 650 m || multiple || 2003–2021 || 06 Jan 2021 || 59 || align=left | Disc.: LPL/Spacewatch II || 
|- id="2003 SU448" bgcolor=#E9E9E9
| 1 ||  || MBA-M || 17.5 || data-sort-value="0.94" | 940 m || multiple || 2003–2020 || 08 Dec 2020 || 76 || align=left | Disc.: Spacewatch || 
|- id="2003 SV448" bgcolor=#E9E9E9
| 0 ||  || MBA-M || 17.00 || 2.2 km || multiple || 2003–2021 || 05 Nov 2021 || 127 || align=left | Disc.: Spacewatch || 
|- id="2003 SW448" bgcolor=#fefefe
| 1 ||  || MBA-I || 19.2 || data-sort-value="0.43" | 430 m || multiple || 2003–2019 || 01 Nov 2019 || 62 || align=left | Disc.: Spacewatch || 
|- id="2003 SX448" bgcolor=#E9E9E9
| 0 ||  || MBA-M || 18.98 || data-sort-value="0.89" | 890 m || multiple || 2003–2021 || 02 Oct 2021 || 46 || align=left | Disc.: Spacewatch || 
|- id="2003 SY448" bgcolor=#E9E9E9
| 3 ||  || MBA-M || 18.0 || 1.1 km || multiple || 2003–2016 || 12 Sep 2016 || 26 || align=left | Disc.: NEAT || 
|- id="2003 SZ448" bgcolor=#E9E9E9
| 0 ||  || MBA-M || 17.4 || data-sort-value="0.98" | 980 m || multiple || 2003–2021 || 12 Jan 2021 || 117 || align=left | Disc.: Spacewatch || 
|- id="2003 SA449" bgcolor=#fefefe
| 0 ||  || MBA-I || 18.92 || data-sort-value="0.49" | 490 m || multiple || 2003–2021 || 08 Sep 2021 || 48 || align=left | Disc.: Spacewatch || 
|- id="2003 SB449" bgcolor=#E9E9E9
| 0 ||  || MBA-M || 18.41 || 1.2 km || multiple || 2003–2021 || 09 Nov 2021 || 63 || align=left | Disc.: SDSS || 
|- id="2003 SC449" bgcolor=#E9E9E9
| 0 ||  || MBA-M || 17.9 || 1.1 km || multiple || 2003–2020 || 15 Dec 2020 || 65 || align=left | Disc.: LPL/Spacewatch II || 
|- id="2003 SD449" bgcolor=#E9E9E9
| 0 ||  || MBA-M || 17.9 || data-sort-value="0.78" | 780 m || multiple || 2003–2021 || 15 Jan 2021 || 39 || align=left | Disc.: SDSS || 
|- id="2003 SE449" bgcolor=#fefefe
| 0 ||  || HUN || 18.36 || data-sort-value="0.63" | 630 m || multiple || 2003–2021 || 12 Jun 2021 || 121 || align=left | Disc.: SpacewatchAlt.: 2014 WG370 || 
|- id="2003 SF449" bgcolor=#E9E9E9
| 0 ||  || MBA-M || 17.9 || 1.1 km || multiple || 2003–2021 || 15 Jan 2021 || 154 || align=left | Disc.: Spacewatch || 
|- id="2003 SG449" bgcolor=#E9E9E9
| 2 ||  || MBA-M || 18.4 || data-sort-value="0.88" | 880 m || multiple || 2003–2016 || 08 Sep 2016 || 22 || align=left | Disc.: NEAT || 
|- id="2003 SH449" bgcolor=#fefefe
| 0 ||  || MBA-I || 19.19 || data-sort-value="0.43" | 430 m || multiple || 2003–2021 || 04 Oct 2021 || 65 || align=left | Disc.: Spacewatch || 
|- id="2003 SJ449" bgcolor=#d6d6d6
| 0 ||  || MBA-O || 17.0 || 2.2 km || multiple || 2003–2020 || 17 Nov 2020 || 50 || align=left | Disc.: SDSS || 
|- id="2003 SK449" bgcolor=#E9E9E9
| 0 ||  || MBA-M || 17.7 || 1.6 km || multiple || 2003–2021 || 08 Jun 2021 || 48 || align=left | Disc.: Spacewatch || 
|- id="2003 SL449" bgcolor=#fefefe
| 3 ||  || MBA-I || 20.2 || data-sort-value="0.27" | 270 m || multiple || 2003–2017 || 21 Sep 2017 || 20 || align=left | Disc.: Spacewatch || 
|- id="2003 SM449" bgcolor=#fefefe
| 2 ||  || MBA-I || 19.3 || data-sort-value="0.41" | 410 m || multiple || 2003–2021 || 18 Jan 2021 || 31 || align=left | Disc.: Spacewatch || 
|- id="2003 SN449" bgcolor=#d6d6d6
| 0 ||  || MBA-O || 17.18 || 2.0 km || multiple || 2003–2021 || 15 Apr 2021 || 95 || align=left | Disc.: SpacewatchAlt.: 2010 HE126 || 
|- id="2003 SO449" bgcolor=#E9E9E9
| 0 ||  || MBA-M || 18.02 || 1.4 km || multiple || 2003–2021 || 29 Aug 2021 || 35 || align=left | Disc.: Spacewatch || 
|- id="2003 SP449" bgcolor=#d6d6d6
| 3 ||  || MBA-O || 17.6 || 1.7 km || multiple || 2003–2014 || 27 Sep 2014 || 17 || align=left | Disc.: LPL/Spacewatch II || 
|- id="2003 SQ449" bgcolor=#d6d6d6
| 0 ||  || MBA-O || 17.5 || 1.8 km || multiple || 2003–2020 || 22 Dec 2020 || 52 || align=left | Disc.: Spacewatch || 
|- id="2003 SR449" bgcolor=#fefefe
| 3 ||  || MBA-I || 19.1 || data-sort-value="0.45" | 450 m || multiple || 2003–2017 || 14 Sep 2017 || 28 || align=left | Disc.: Spacewatch || 
|- id="2003 ST449" bgcolor=#E9E9E9
| 1 ||  || MBA-M || 18.5 || data-sort-value="0.84" | 840 m || multiple || 2003–2020 || 05 Nov 2020 || 58 || align=left | Disc.: Spacewatch || 
|- id="2003 SU449" bgcolor=#d6d6d6
| 0 ||  || MBA-O || 15.9 || 3.7 km || multiple || 1998–2021 || 17 Jan 2021 || 178 || align=left | Disc.: NEATAlt.: 2010 FD44 || 
|- id="2003 SV449" bgcolor=#fefefe
| 0 ||  || MBA-I || 18.62 || data-sort-value="0.56" | 560 m || multiple || 1995–2021 || 04 May 2021 || 116 || align=left | Disc.: Spacewatch || 
|- id="2003 SX449" bgcolor=#fefefe
| 1 ||  || MBA-I || 18.6 || data-sort-value="0.57" | 570 m || multiple || 2003–2019 || 28 Dec 2019 || 91 || align=left | Disc.: AMOS || 
|- id="2003 SY449" bgcolor=#fefefe
| 0 ||  || MBA-I || 17.5 || data-sort-value="0.94" | 940 m || multiple || 2003–2018 || 16 Dec 2018 || 86 || align=left | Disc.: SpacewatchAlt.: 2010 MT138 || 
|- id="2003 SZ449" bgcolor=#d6d6d6
| 0 ||  || MBA-O || 17.3 || 1.9 km || multiple || 2003–2020 || 07 Dec 2020 || 187 || align=left | Disc.: Spacewatch || 
|- id="2003 SA450" bgcolor=#d6d6d6
| 0 ||  || HIL || 16.1 || 3.4 km || multiple || 1995–2020 || 14 Feb 2020 || 108 || align=left | Disc.: CINEOS || 
|- id="2003 SB450" bgcolor=#d6d6d6
| 0 ||  || MBA-O || 16.8 || 2.4 km || multiple || 2003–2019 || 01 Nov 2019 || 77 || align=left | Disc.: LPL/Spacewatch II || 
|- id="2003 SC450" bgcolor=#fefefe
| 0 ||  || MBA-I || 18.0 || data-sort-value="0.75" | 750 m || multiple || 2003–2020 || 11 Dec 2020 || 81 || align=left | Disc.: Spacewatch || 
|- id="2003 SD450" bgcolor=#d6d6d6
| 0 ||  || MBA-O || 17.1 || 2.1 km || multiple || 1998–2019 || 05 Nov 2019 || 69 || align=left | Disc.: Spacewatch || 
|- id="2003 SE450" bgcolor=#fefefe
| 0 ||  || MBA-I || 19.04 || data-sort-value="0.46" | 460 m || multiple || 2003–2021 || 15 Apr 2021 || 75 || align=left | Disc.: Spacewatch || 
|- id="2003 SF450" bgcolor=#fefefe
| 0 ||  || MBA-I || 18.46 || data-sort-value="0.60" | 600 m || multiple || 2003–2021 || 13 May 2021 || 120 || align=left | Disc.: Spacewatch || 
|- id="2003 SG450" bgcolor=#fefefe
| 0 ||  || MBA-I || 18.4 || data-sort-value="0.62" | 620 m || multiple || 2003–2019 || 28 Nov 2019 || 72 || align=left | Disc.: LPL/Spacewatch II || 
|- id="2003 SK450" bgcolor=#E9E9E9
| 0 ||  || MBA-M || 17.16 || 2.1 km || multiple || 2003–2021 || 03 Oct 2021 || 133 || align=left | Disc.: Spacewatch || 
|- id="2003 SL450" bgcolor=#d6d6d6
| 0 ||  || MBA-O || 16.9 || 2.3 km || multiple || 2003–2019 || 04 Nov 2019 || 65 || align=left | Disc.: Spacewatch || 
|- id="2003 SN450" bgcolor=#d6d6d6
| 0 ||  || MBA-O || 16.5 || 2.8 km || multiple || 2003–2019 || 02 Nov 2019 || 70 || align=left | Disc.: Spacewatch || 
|- id="2003 SQ450" bgcolor=#d6d6d6
| 0 ||  || MBA-O || 16.8 || 2.4 km || multiple || 2003–2019 || 23 Oct 2019 || 64 || align=left | Disc.: SDSS || 
|- id="2003 SS450" bgcolor=#E9E9E9
| 0 ||  || MBA-M || 18.33 || data-sort-value="0.64" | 640 m || multiple || 2003–2021 || 15 Apr 2021 || 68 || align=left | Disc.: SDSS || 
|- id="2003 ST450" bgcolor=#fefefe
| 1 ||  || HUN || 18.5 || data-sort-value="0.59" | 590 m || multiple || 1995–2019 || 05 Nov 2019 || 80 || align=left | Disc.: Spacewatch || 
|- id="2003 SU450" bgcolor=#d6d6d6
| 0 ||  || MBA-O || 16.8 || 2.4 km || multiple || 2003–2019 || 20 Oct 2019 || 63 || align=left | Disc.: LPL/Spacewatch II || 
|- id="2003 SV450" bgcolor=#d6d6d6
| 0 ||  || MBA-O || 17.0 || 2.2 km || multiple || 2003–2019 || 24 Dec 2019 || 65 || align=left | Disc.: SDSS || 
|- id="2003 SW450" bgcolor=#d6d6d6
| 0 ||  || MBA-O || 16.7 || 2.5 km || multiple || 2003–2020 || 12 Dec 2020 || 68 || align=left | Disc.: Spacewatch || 
|- id="2003 SX450" bgcolor=#fefefe
| 1 ||  || MBA-I || 18.9 || data-sort-value="0.49" | 490 m || multiple || 2003–2019 || 28 Nov 2019 || 63 || align=left | Disc.: LONEOS || 
|- id="2003 SY450" bgcolor=#d6d6d6
| 0 ||  || MBA-O || 17.40 || 1.8 km || multiple || 2003–2021 || 17 Apr 2021 || 96 || align=left | Disc.: Spacewatch || 
|- id="2003 SZ450" bgcolor=#d6d6d6
| 0 ||  || HIL || 16.23 || 3.2 km || multiple || 2004–2022 || 26 Jan 2022 || 88 || align=left | Disc.: LPL/Spacewatch II || 
|- id="2003 SA451" bgcolor=#d6d6d6
| 0 ||  || HIL || 16.1 || 3.4 km || multiple || 2003–2021 || 18 Jan 2021 || 72 || align=left | Disc.: Spacewatch || 
|- id="2003 SB451" bgcolor=#d6d6d6
| 0 ||  || MBA-O || 16.8 || 2.4 km || multiple || 2002–2019 || 08 Nov 2019 || 68 || align=left | Disc.: Spacewatch || 
|- id="2003 SC451" bgcolor=#d6d6d6
| 0 ||  || MBA-O || 16.6 || 2.7 km || multiple || 2003–2021 || 15 Jan 2021 || 70 || align=left | Disc.: SDSS || 
|- id="2003 SE451" bgcolor=#E9E9E9
| 0 ||  || MBA-M || 17.32 || 1.4 km || multiple || 2003–2022 || 27 Jan 2022 || 134 || align=left | Disc.: SDSSAlt.: 2010 MU44 || 
|- id="2003 SF451" bgcolor=#d6d6d6
| 0 ||  || MBA-O || 16.5 || 2.8 km || multiple || 2003–2021 || 15 Jan 2021 || 96 || align=left | Disc.: Spacewatch || 
|- id="2003 SG451" bgcolor=#fefefe
| 0 ||  || MBA-I || 18.7 || data-sort-value="0.54" | 540 m || multiple || 2003–2020 || 10 Dec 2020 || 74 || align=left | Disc.: Spacewatch || 
|- id="2003 SJ451" bgcolor=#d6d6d6
| 0 ||  || MBA-O || 16.7 || 2.5 km || multiple || 2003–2019 || 23 Oct 2019 || 55 || align=left | Disc.: Spacewatch || 
|- id="2003 SK451" bgcolor=#fefefe
| 0 ||  || MBA-I || 18.68 || data-sort-value="0.55" | 550 m || multiple || 2003–2020 || 23 Mar 2020 || 62 || align=left | Disc.: Spacewatch || 
|- id="2003 SL451" bgcolor=#d6d6d6
| 0 ||  || MBA-O || 16.6 || 2.7 km || multiple || 2003–2020 || 05 Nov 2020 || 67 || align=left | Disc.: Spacewatch || 
|- id="2003 SM451" bgcolor=#d6d6d6
| 0 ||  || MBA-O || 17.0 || 2.2 km || multiple || 2003–2019 || 21 Sep 2019 || 98 || align=left | Disc.: Spacewatch || 
|- id="2003 SO451" bgcolor=#fefefe
| 0 ||  || MBA-I || 18.9 || data-sort-value="0.49" | 490 m || multiple || 2003–2019 || 03 Jun 2019 || 57 || align=left | Disc.: Spacewatch || 
|- id="2003 SP451" bgcolor=#E9E9E9
| 0 ||  || MBA-M || 17.9 || data-sort-value="0.78" | 780 m || multiple || 2003–2020 || 15 Oct 2020 || 58 || align=left | Disc.: LPL/Spacewatch II || 
|- id="2003 SQ451" bgcolor=#E9E9E9
| 0 ||  || MBA-M || 17.6 || 1.3 km || multiple || 2003–2020 || 11 Dec 2020 || 97 || align=left | Disc.: SpacewatchAlt.: 2011 OC69 || 
|- id="2003 SR451" bgcolor=#d6d6d6
| 0 ||  || MBA-O || 17.05 || 2.2 km || multiple || 2003–2021 || 03 Apr 2021 || 69 || align=left | Disc.: SDSS || 
|- id="2003 ST451" bgcolor=#d6d6d6
| 0 ||  || MBA-O || 16.8 || 2.4 km || multiple || 2003–2021 || 18 Jan 2021 || 63 || align=left | Disc.: Spacewatch || 
|- id="2003 SU451" bgcolor=#fefefe
| 0 ||  || MBA-I || 18.26 || data-sort-value="0.66" | 660 m || multiple || 2003–2022 || 26 Jan 2022 || 102 || align=left | Disc.: Spacewatch || 
|- id="2003 SV451" bgcolor=#fefefe
| 0 ||  || MBA-I || 18.0 || data-sort-value="0.75" | 750 m || multiple || 2003–2020 || 26 Jan 2020 || 65 || align=left | Disc.: Spacewatch || 
|- id="2003 SW451" bgcolor=#d6d6d6
| 0 ||  || MBA-O || 15.3 || 4.8 km || multiple || 2003–2021 || 17 Jan 2021 || 182 || align=left | Disc.: Spacewatch || 
|- id="2003 SX451" bgcolor=#E9E9E9
| 0 ||  || MBA-M || 17.7 || data-sort-value="0.86" | 860 m || multiple || 2003–2019 || 08 Aug 2019 || 54 || align=left | Disc.: Spacewatch || 
|- id="2003 SY451" bgcolor=#fefefe
| 0 ||  || MBA-I || 17.38 || data-sort-value="0.99" | 990 m || multiple || 2003–2021 || 06 May 2021 || 92 || align=left | Disc.: Spacewatch || 
|- id="2003 SA452" bgcolor=#E9E9E9
| 0 ||  || MBA-M || 17.77 || 1.6 km || multiple || 2003–2021 || 01 Nov 2021 || 76 || align=left | Disc.: SDSSAlt.: 2003 SJ473 || 
|- id="2003 SB452" bgcolor=#fefefe
| 0 ||  || MBA-I || 17.75 || data-sort-value="0.84" | 840 m || multiple || 2003–2021 || 08 Apr 2021 || 70 || align=left | Disc.: Spacewatch || 
|- id="2003 SC452" bgcolor=#d6d6d6
| 0 ||  || MBA-O || 16.5 || 2.8 km || multiple || 2003–2021 || 16 Jan 2021 || 70 || align=left | Disc.: SpacewatchAlt.: 2010 DZ18 || 
|- id="2003 SE452" bgcolor=#d6d6d6
| 0 ||  || MBA-O || 17.1 || 2.1 km || multiple || 2003–2019 || 19 Nov 2019 || 54 || align=left | Disc.: Spacewatch || 
|- id="2003 SG452" bgcolor=#E9E9E9
| 2 ||  || MBA-M || 19.3 || data-sort-value="0.41" | 410 m || multiple || 2003–2019 || 21 Oct 2019 || 56 || align=left | Disc.: Spacewatch || 
|- id="2003 SH452" bgcolor=#fefefe
| 0 ||  || MBA-I || 18.9 || data-sort-value="0.49" | 490 m || multiple || 1996–2019 || 02 Nov 2019 || 61 || align=left | Disc.: Spacewatch || 
|- id="2003 SJ452" bgcolor=#d6d6d6
| 0 ||  || MBA-O || 16.1 || 3.4 km || multiple || 2000–2021 || 08 Jun 2021 || 94 || align=left | Disc.: LPL/Spacewatch II || 
|- id="2003 SK452" bgcolor=#E9E9E9
| 0 ||  || MBA-M || 17.62 || 1.7 km || multiple || 2003–2021 || 29 Sep 2021 || 64 || align=left | Disc.: LPL/Spacewatch II || 
|- id="2003 SL452" bgcolor=#d6d6d6
| 0 ||  || MBA-O || 17.24 || 2.0 km || multiple || 2003–2022 || 25 Jan 2022 || 78 || align=left | Disc.: LPL/Spacewatch II || 
|- id="2003 SM452" bgcolor=#d6d6d6
| 0 ||  || MBA-O || 16.7 || 2.5 km || multiple || 2003–2020 || 12 Oct 2020 || 57 || align=left | Disc.: Spacewatch || 
|- id="2003 SN452" bgcolor=#fefefe
| 1 ||  || MBA-I || 18.5 || data-sort-value="0.59" | 590 m || multiple || 2003–2019 || 07 Feb 2019 || 62 || align=left | Disc.: SpacewatchAlt.: 2016 GA44 || 
|- id="2003 SO452" bgcolor=#fefefe
| 0 ||  || MBA-I || 18.2 || data-sort-value="0.68" | 680 m || multiple || 2003–2020 || 14 Dec 2020 || 66 || align=left | Disc.: SDSS || 
|- id="2003 SP452" bgcolor=#fefefe
| 0 ||  || MBA-I || 19.28 || data-sort-value="0.41" | 410 m || multiple || 2003–2019 || 24 Jul 2019 || 43 || align=left | Disc.: Spacewatch || 
|- id="2003 SQ452" bgcolor=#d6d6d6
| 0 ||  || HIL || 15.9 || 3.7 km || multiple || 2003–2021 || 18 Jan 2021 || 63 || align=left | Disc.: Spacewatch || 
|- id="2003 SR452" bgcolor=#fefefe
| 2 ||  || MBA-I || 18.8 || data-sort-value="0.52" | 520 m || multiple || 2003–2019 || 20 Dec 2019 || 61 || align=left | Disc.: NEAT || 
|- id="2003 ST452" bgcolor=#fefefe
| 1 ||  || MBA-I || 18.9 || data-sort-value="0.49" | 490 m || multiple || 2003–2019 || 08 Nov 2019 || 55 || align=left | Disc.: Spacewatch || 
|- id="2003 SU452" bgcolor=#d6d6d6
| 0 ||  || MBA-O || 16.8 || 2.4 km || multiple || 2003–2021 || 15 Jan 2021 || 75 || align=left | Disc.: SpacewatchAlt.: 2010 CJ254 || 
|- id="2003 SW452" bgcolor=#d6d6d6
| 0 ||  || MBA-O || 17.0 || 2.2 km || multiple || 2003–2019 || 28 Nov 2019 || 44 || align=left | Disc.: SDSS || 
|- id="2003 SX452" bgcolor=#fefefe
| 0 ||  || MBA-I || 18.1 || data-sort-value="0.71" | 710 m || multiple || 2003–2021 || 16 Jan 2021 || 83 || align=left | Disc.: Spacewatch || 
|- id="2003 SY452" bgcolor=#FA8072
| 0 ||  || MCA || 18.9 || data-sort-value="0.49" | 490 m || multiple || 2003–2019 || 01 Jul 2019 || 57 || align=left | Disc.: Spacewatch || 
|- id="2003 SZ452" bgcolor=#E9E9E9
| 0 ||  || MBA-M || 17.4 || data-sort-value="0.98" | 980 m || multiple || 2003–2020 || 17 Dec 2020 || 70 || align=left | Disc.: LPL/Spacewatch II || 
|- id="2003 SA453" bgcolor=#d6d6d6
| 0 ||  || MBA-O || 17.4 || 1.8 km || multiple || 2003–2020 || 09 Dec 2020 || 52 || align=left | Disc.: LPL/Spacewatch II || 
|- id="2003 SB453" bgcolor=#d6d6d6
| 0 ||  || MBA-O || 17.1 || 2.1 km || multiple || 2003–2019 || 26 Sep 2019 || 48 || align=left | Disc.: Spacewatch || 
|- id="2003 SC453" bgcolor=#E9E9E9
| 0 ||  || MBA-M || 18.1 || data-sort-value="0.71" | 710 m || multiple || 2003–2019 || 23 Oct 2019 || 56 || align=left | Disc.: Spacewatch || 
|- id="2003 SD453" bgcolor=#fefefe
| 0 ||  || MBA-I || 18.2 || data-sort-value="0.68" | 680 m || multiple || 2003–2020 || 15 Oct 2020 || 72 || align=left | Disc.: SDSS || 
|- id="2003 SE453" bgcolor=#fefefe
| 0 ||  || MBA-I || 17.7 || data-sort-value="0.86" | 860 m || multiple || 2003–2020 || 01 Jan 2020 || 52 || align=left | Disc.: Spacewatch || 
|- id="2003 SF453" bgcolor=#d6d6d6
| 0 ||  || MBA-O || 17.11 || 2.1 km || multiple || 2003–2022 || 08 Jan 2022 || 55 || align=left | Disc.: Spacewatch || 
|- id="2003 SG453" bgcolor=#fefefe
| 1 ||  || MBA-I || 19.1 || data-sort-value="0.45" | 450 m || multiple || 2003–2019 || 01 Nov 2019 || 53 || align=left | Disc.: Spacewatch || 
|- id="2003 SH453" bgcolor=#d6d6d6
| 1 ||  || MBA-O || 17.0 || 2.2 km || multiple || 2003–2019 || 05 Nov 2019 || 62 || align=left | Disc.: Spacewatch || 
|- id="2003 SJ453" bgcolor=#d6d6d6
| 0 ||  || MBA-O || 17.3 || 1.9 km || multiple || 2003–2020 || 24 Dec 2020 || 52 || align=left | Disc.: SDSS || 
|- id="2003 SK453" bgcolor=#fefefe
| 0 ||  || MBA-I || 18.59 || data-sort-value="0.57" | 570 m || multiple || 2003–2021 || 08 May 2021 || 64 || align=left | Disc.: Spacewatch || 
|- id="2003 SL453" bgcolor=#E9E9E9
| 2 ||  || MBA-M || 18.5 || data-sort-value="0.59" | 590 m || multiple || 2003–2019 || 03 Oct 2019 || 41 || align=left | Disc.: SDSS || 
|- id="2003 SM453" bgcolor=#fefefe
| 0 ||  || MBA-I || 18.6 || data-sort-value="0.57" | 570 m || multiple || 2003–2020 || 08 Dec 2020 || 95 || align=left | Disc.: Spacewatch || 
|- id="2003 SN453" bgcolor=#fefefe
| 2 ||  || MBA-I || 19.2 || data-sort-value="0.43" | 430 m || multiple || 2003–2019 || 26 Oct 2019 || 43 || align=left | Disc.: Spacewatch || 
|- id="2003 SP453" bgcolor=#d6d6d6
| 0 ||  || MBA-O || 16.9 || 2.3 km || multiple || 2003–2020 || 17 Nov 2020 || 65 || align=left | Disc.: SDSS || 
|- id="2003 SQ453" bgcolor=#fefefe
| 0 ||  || MBA-I || 18.6 || data-sort-value="0.57" | 570 m || multiple || 2003–2020 || 14 Dec 2020 || 75 || align=left | Disc.: Spacewatch || 
|- id="2003 SR453" bgcolor=#d6d6d6
| 0 ||  || MBA-O || 16.9 || 2.3 km || multiple || 2003–2019 || 03 Oct 2019 || 49 || align=left | Disc.: Spacewatch || 
|- id="2003 SS453" bgcolor=#E9E9E9
| 0 ||  || MBA-M || 18.0 || data-sort-value="0.75" | 750 m || multiple || 2003–2020 || 10 Dec 2020 || 64 || align=left | Disc.: Spacewatch || 
|- id="2003 ST453" bgcolor=#d6d6d6
| 0 ||  || HIL || 16.5 || 2.8 km || multiple || 2003–2019 || 19 Nov 2019 || 45 || align=left | Disc.: Spacewatch || 
|- id="2003 SU453" bgcolor=#d6d6d6
| 0 ||  || HIL || 16.5 || 2.8 km || multiple || 1995–2019 || 19 Nov 2019 || 50 || align=left | Disc.: Spacewatch || 
|- id="2003 SV453" bgcolor=#d6d6d6
| 0 ||  || MBA-O || 17.1 || 2.1 km || multiple || 2003–2019 || 20 Oct 2019 || 44 || align=left | Disc.: Spacewatch || 
|- id="2003 SW453" bgcolor=#d6d6d6
| 2 ||  || MBA-O || 17.6 || 1.7 km || multiple || 2003–2018 || 06 Oct 2018 || 49 || align=left | Disc.: Spacewatch || 
|- id="2003 SX453" bgcolor=#fefefe
| 2 ||  || MBA-I || 18.9 || data-sort-value="0.49" | 490 m || multiple || 2003–2019 || 04 Dec 2019 || 58 || align=left | Disc.: Spacewatch || 
|- id="2003 SY453" bgcolor=#E9E9E9
| 0 ||  || MBA-M || 17.80 || 1.5 km || multiple || 2003–2021 || 09 Nov 2021 || 66 || align=left | Disc.: SDSS || 
|- id="2003 SZ453" bgcolor=#d6d6d6
| 0 ||  || MBA-O || 17.01 || 2.2 km || multiple || 1994–2021 || 13 Apr 2021 || 63 || align=left | Disc.: Spacewatch || 
|- id="2003 SA454" bgcolor=#fefefe
| 0 ||  || MBA-I || 18.4 || data-sort-value="0.62" | 620 m || multiple || 2003–2019 || 26 Jul 2019 || 45 || align=left | Disc.: Spacewatch || 
|- id="2003 SB454" bgcolor=#d6d6d6
| 0 ||  || MBA-O || 16.94 || 2.3 km || multiple || 1997–2021 || 18 May 2021 || 85 || align=left | Disc.: SpacewatchAlt.: 2010 FU131 || 
|- id="2003 SD454" bgcolor=#d6d6d6
| 0 ||  || MBA-O || 16.86 || 2.4 km || multiple || 2003–2022 || 26 Jan 2022 || 52 || align=left | Disc.: SpacewatchAlt.: 2017 FV171 || 
|- id="2003 SE454" bgcolor=#E9E9E9
| 0 ||  || MBA-M || 17.50 || 1.3 km || multiple || 2003–2021 || 28 Nov 2021 || 77 || align=left | Disc.: Spacewatch || 
|- id="2003 SF454" bgcolor=#E9E9E9
| 0 ||  || MBA-M || 17.6 || 1.7 km || multiple || 2003–2019 || 04 Feb 2019 || 44 || align=left | Disc.: LPL/Spacewatch II || 
|- id="2003 SG454" bgcolor=#fefefe
| 0 ||  || MBA-I || 18.8 || data-sort-value="0.52" | 520 m || multiple || 2003–2020 || 23 Oct 2020 || 44 || align=left | Disc.: Spacewatch || 
|- id="2003 SH454" bgcolor=#fefefe
| 0 ||  || MBA-I || 18.3 || data-sort-value="0.65" | 650 m || multiple || 2003–2020 || 16 Mar 2020 || 49 || align=left | Disc.: Spacewatch || 
|- id="2003 SL454" bgcolor=#E9E9E9
| 2 ||  || MBA-M || 17.8 || data-sort-value="0.82" | 820 m || multiple || 2003–2021 || 12 Jan 2021 || 47 || align=left | Disc.: Spacewatch || 
|- id="2003 SM454" bgcolor=#d6d6d6
| 0 ||  || MBA-O || 16.8 || 2.4 km || multiple || 2003–2019 || 24 Oct 2019 || 42 || align=left | Disc.: Spacewatch || 
|- id="2003 SN454" bgcolor=#fefefe
| 0 ||  || MBA-I || 18.5 || data-sort-value="0.59" | 590 m || multiple || 2003–2020 || 10 Dec 2020 || 49 || align=left | Disc.: Spacewatch || 
|- id="2003 SO454" bgcolor=#d6d6d6
| 0 ||  || MBA-O || 17.0 || 2.2 km || multiple || 2003–2019 || 02 Dec 2019 || 54 || align=left | Disc.: Spacewatch || 
|- id="2003 SP454" bgcolor=#E9E9E9
| 0 ||  || MBA-M || 17.24 || 1.1 km || multiple || 2003–2022 || 24 Jan 2022 || 71 || align=left | Disc.: CINEOS || 
|- id="2003 SQ454" bgcolor=#d6d6d6
| 2 ||  || MBA-O || 17.4 || 1.8 km || multiple || 2003–2019 || 19 Nov 2019 || 53 || align=left | Disc.: Spacewatch || 
|- id="2003 SR454" bgcolor=#d6d6d6
| 0 ||  || MBA-O || 17.8 || 1.5 km || multiple || 2003–2019 || 25 Sep 2019 || 38 || align=left | Disc.: LPL/Spacewatch II || 
|- id="2003 SS454" bgcolor=#fefefe
| 0 ||  || MBA-I || 18.9 || data-sort-value="0.49" | 490 m || multiple || 2003–2019 || 06 Sep 2019 || 43 || align=left | Disc.: Spacewatch || 
|- id="2003 ST454" bgcolor=#E9E9E9
| 0 ||  || MBA-M || 18.0 || 1.1 km || multiple || 2003–2020 || 08 Oct 2020 || 49 || align=left | Disc.: SDSS || 
|- id="2003 SU454" bgcolor=#fefefe
| 2 ||  || MBA-I || 19.3 || data-sort-value="0.41" | 410 m || multiple || 2003–2019 || 01 Nov 2019 || 39 || align=left | Disc.: LONEOS || 
|- id="2003 SV454" bgcolor=#fefefe
| 1 ||  || MBA-I || 19.0 || data-sort-value="0.47" | 470 m || multiple || 2003–2018 || 11 Nov 2018 || 45 || align=left | Disc.: Spacewatch || 
|- id="2003 SW454" bgcolor=#E9E9E9
| 0 ||  || MBA-M || 17.44 || 1.8 km || multiple || 2003–2021 || 09 Jul 2021 || 56 || align=left | Disc.: Spacewatch || 
|- id="2003 SX454" bgcolor=#E9E9E9
| 0 ||  || MBA-M || 17.7 || data-sort-value="0.86" | 860 m || multiple || 2003–2020 || 17 Nov 2020 || 56 || align=left | Disc.: Spacewatch || 
|- id="2003 SY454" bgcolor=#d6d6d6
| 0 ||  || MBA-O || 17.1 || 2.1 km || multiple || 1992–2020 || 20 Oct 2020 || 41 || align=left | Disc.: Spacewatch || 
|- id="2003 SZ454" bgcolor=#E9E9E9
| 2 ||  || MBA-M || 18.6 || data-sort-value="0.57" | 570 m || multiple || 2003–2019 || 25 Sep 2019 || 34 || align=left | Disc.: Spacewatch || 
|- id="2003 SA455" bgcolor=#d6d6d6
| 0 ||  || MBA-O || 17.0 || 2.2 km || multiple || 2003–2020 || 07 Dec 2020 || 42 || align=left | Disc.: Spacewatch || 
|- id="2003 SB455" bgcolor=#d6d6d6
| 2 ||  || MBA-O || 17.9 || 1.5 km || multiple || 2003–2020 || 25 Jan 2020 || 39 || align=left | Disc.: Spacewatch || 
|- id="2003 SC455" bgcolor=#E9E9E9
| 0 ||  || MBA-M || 17.4 || 1.8 km || multiple || 2003–2019 || 26 Feb 2019 || 49 || align=left | Disc.: Spacewatch || 
|- id="2003 SD455" bgcolor=#E9E9E9
| 0 ||  || MBA-M || 17.1 || 1.1 km || multiple || 2003–2020 || 10 Dec 2020 || 81 || align=left | Disc.: SpacewatchAlt.: 2007 PP8 || 
|- id="2003 SE455" bgcolor=#fefefe
| 0 ||  || MBA-I || 18.2 || data-sort-value="0.68" | 680 m || multiple || 2003–2018 || 07 Aug 2018 || 38 || align=left | Disc.: Spacewatch || 
|- id="2003 SF455" bgcolor=#fefefe
| 2 ||  || MBA-I || 19.5 || data-sort-value="0.37" | 370 m || multiple || 2003–2019 || 03 Oct 2019 || 36 || align=left | Disc.: Spacewatch || 
|- id="2003 SG455" bgcolor=#E9E9E9
| 0 ||  || MBA-M || 17.2 || 1.1 km || multiple || 1995–2021 || 06 Jan 2021 || 65 || align=left | Disc.: Spacewatch || 
|- id="2003 SH455" bgcolor=#fefefe
| 0 ||  || MBA-I || 18.4 || data-sort-value="0.62" | 620 m || multiple || 2003–2020 || 22 Apr 2020 || 47 || align=left | Disc.: Spacewatch || 
|- id="2003 SJ455" bgcolor=#fefefe
| 1 ||  || MBA-I || 18.6 || data-sort-value="0.57" | 570 m || multiple || 2003–2018 || 13 Nov 2018 || 40 || align=left | Disc.: Spacewatch || 
|- id="2003 SL455" bgcolor=#E9E9E9
| 2 ||  || MBA-M || 18.3 || data-sort-value="0.65" | 650 m || multiple || 2003–2019 || 01 Nov 2019 || 34 || align=left | Disc.: SDSS || 
|- id="2003 SM455" bgcolor=#d6d6d6
| 0 ||  || MBA-O || 17.3 || 1.9 km || multiple || 2003–2021 || 15 Jan 2021 || 46 || align=left | Disc.: Spacewatch || 
|- id="2003 SN455" bgcolor=#d6d6d6
| 0 ||  || MBA-O || 16.8 || 2.4 km || multiple || 2003–2018 || 09 Nov 2018 || 34 || align=left | Disc.: Spacewatch || 
|- id="2003 SO455" bgcolor=#d6d6d6
| 0 ||  || MBA-O || 17.2 || 2.0 km || multiple || 2003–2019 || 20 Oct 2019 || 46 || align=left | Disc.: Spacewatch || 
|- id="2003 SP455" bgcolor=#d6d6d6
| 0 ||  || MBA-O || 16.1 || 3.4 km || multiple || 2003–2020 || 21 Oct 2020 || 58 || align=left | Disc.: Spacewatch || 
|- id="2003 SQ455" bgcolor=#fefefe
| 0 ||  || MBA-I || 18.7 || data-sort-value="0.54" | 540 m || multiple || 2003–2018 || 06 Oct 2018 || 40 || align=left | Disc.: Spacewatch || 
|- id="2003 SR455" bgcolor=#d6d6d6
| 0 ||  || MBA-O || 17.1 || 2.1 km || multiple || 2002–2021 || 16 Jan 2021 || 45 || align=left | Disc.: SDSS || 
|- id="2003 SS455" bgcolor=#d6d6d6
| 2 ||  || MBA-O || 17.6 || 1.7 km || multiple || 2003–2018 || 05 Oct 2018 || 36 || align=left | Disc.: LPL/Spacewatch II || 
|- id="2003 ST455" bgcolor=#d6d6d6
| 0 ||  || MBA-O || 17.0 || 2.2 km || multiple || 2003–2020 || 16 Sep 2020 || 59 || align=left | Disc.: SDSS || 
|- id="2003 SU455" bgcolor=#fefefe
| 3 ||  || MBA-I || 19.2 || data-sort-value="0.43" | 430 m || multiple || 2003–2019 || 19 Nov 2019 || 36 || align=left | Disc.: Spacewatch || 
|- id="2003 SV455" bgcolor=#fefefe
| 0 ||  || MBA-I || 18.5 || data-sort-value="0.59" | 590 m || multiple || 2003–2020 || 23 Aug 2020 || 41 || align=left | Disc.: Spacewatch || 
|- id="2003 SW455" bgcolor=#fefefe
| 2 ||  || MBA-I || 19.2 || data-sort-value="0.43" | 430 m || multiple || 2003–2018 || 15 Oct 2018 || 33 || align=left | Disc.: Spacewatch || 
|- id="2003 SX455" bgcolor=#d6d6d6
| 0 ||  || MBA-O || 16.9 || 2.3 km || multiple || 2003–2019 || 01 Oct 2019 || 37 || align=left | Disc.: Spacewatch || 
|- id="2003 SY455" bgcolor=#E9E9E9
| 0 ||  || MBA-M || 17.60 || 1.7 km || multiple || 2003–2021 || 26 Oct 2021 || 73 || align=left | Disc.: SDSS || 
|- id="2003 SZ455" bgcolor=#fefefe
| 0 ||  || MBA-I || 18.60 || data-sort-value="0.57" | 570 m || multiple || 2003–2021 || 04 Jul 2021 || 70 || align=left | Disc.: Spacewatch || 
|- id="2003 SA456" bgcolor=#fefefe
| 0 ||  || HUN || 18.7 || data-sort-value="0.54" | 540 m || multiple || 2003–2019 || 25 Oct 2019 || 37 || align=left | Disc.: Spacewatch || 
|- id="2003 SB456" bgcolor=#E9E9E9
| 0 ||  || MBA-M || 17.3 || 1.9 km || multiple || 2003–2017 || 21 Oct 2017 || 34 || align=left | Disc.: Spacewatch || 
|- id="2003 SC456" bgcolor=#fefefe
| 1 ||  || MBA-I || 18.7 || data-sort-value="0.54" | 540 m || multiple || 2003–2019 || 28 Nov 2019 || 43 || align=left | Disc.: Spacewatch || 
|- id="2003 SD456" bgcolor=#fefefe
| 2 ||  || MBA-I || 18.4 || data-sort-value="0.62" | 620 m || multiple || 2003–2018 || 08 Nov 2018 || 30 || align=left | Disc.: Spacewatch || 
|- id="2003 SE456" bgcolor=#d6d6d6
| 0 ||  || MBA-O || 16.6 || 2.7 km || multiple || 2003–2020 || 20 Oct 2020 || 32 || align=left | Disc.: Spacewatch || 
|- id="2003 SF456" bgcolor=#d6d6d6
| 0 ||  || MBA-O || 17.08 || 2.1 km || multiple || 2003–2022 || 27 Jan 2022 || 46 || align=left | Disc.: Spacewatch || 
|- id="2003 SG456" bgcolor=#d6d6d6
| 0 ||  || MBA-O || 17.4 || 1.8 km || multiple || 2003–2019 || 01 Nov 2019 || 29 || align=left | Disc.: Spacewatch || 
|- id="2003 SH456" bgcolor=#d6d6d6
| 0 ||  || HIL || 16.6 || 2.7 km || multiple || 2003–2019 || 02 Nov 2019 || 36 || align=left | Disc.: SDSS || 
|- id="2003 SJ456" bgcolor=#fefefe
| 0 ||  || HUN || 19.01 || data-sort-value="0.47" | 470 m || multiple || 2003–2021 || 25 Nov 2021 || 84 || align=left | Disc.: Spacewatch || 
|- id="2003 SK456" bgcolor=#E9E9E9
| 2 ||  || MBA-M || 18.8 || data-sort-value="0.52" | 520 m || multiple || 2003–2019 || 02 Oct 2019 || 41 || align=left | Disc.: Spacewatch || 
|- id="2003 SL456" bgcolor=#d6d6d6
| 3 ||  || MBA-O || 17.0 || 2.2 km || multiple || 2003–2019 || 03 Oct 2019 || 31 || align=left | Disc.: Spacewatch || 
|- id="2003 SM456" bgcolor=#fefefe
| 0 ||  || MBA-I || 18.66 || data-sort-value="0.55" | 550 m || multiple || 2003–2021 || 08 May 2021 || 42 || align=left | Disc.: Spacewatch || 
|- id="2003 SN456" bgcolor=#fefefe
| 0 ||  || MBA-I || 19.0 || data-sort-value="0.47" | 470 m || multiple || 2003–2020 || 25 Oct 2020 || 31 || align=left | Disc.: Spacewatch || 
|- id="2003 SP456" bgcolor=#E9E9E9
| 1 ||  || MBA-M || 18.9 || data-sort-value="0.49" | 490 m || multiple || 1995–2019 || 01 Jul 2019 || 32 || align=left | Disc.: Spacewatch || 
|- id="2003 SQ456" bgcolor=#E9E9E9
| 0 ||  || MBA-M || 17.8 || data-sort-value="0.82" | 820 m || multiple || 2003–2020 || 17 Nov 2020 || 35 || align=left | Disc.: Spacewatch || 
|- id="2003 SR456" bgcolor=#E9E9E9
| 0 ||  || MBA-M || 18.32 || data-sort-value="0.91" | 910 m || multiple || 2003–2021 || 26 Nov 2021 || 44 || align=left | Disc.: Spacewatch || 
|- id="2003 SS456" bgcolor=#d6d6d6
| 0 ||  || MBA-O || 17.2 || 2.0 km || multiple || 2003–2020 || 21 Jan 2020 || 41 || align=left | Disc.: SDSS || 
|- id="2003 ST456" bgcolor=#fefefe
| 0 ||  || MBA-I || 18.56 || data-sort-value="0.58" | 580 m || multiple || 2003–2021 || 13 Sep 2021 || 78 || align=left | Disc.: Spacewatch || 
|- id="2003 SU456" bgcolor=#d6d6d6
| 1 ||  || HIL || 16.8 || 2.4 km || multiple || 1995–2020 || 19 Jan 2020 || 38 || align=left | Disc.: Spacewatch || 
|- id="2003 SV456" bgcolor=#fefefe
| 1 ||  || MBA-I || 18.1 || data-sort-value="0.71" | 710 m || multiple || 2003–2017 || 19 Nov 2017 || 32 || align=left | Disc.: NEAT || 
|- id="2003 SW456" bgcolor=#fefefe
| 2 ||  || MBA-I || 19.4 || data-sort-value="0.39" | 390 m || multiple || 2003–2019 || 17 Nov 2019 || 34 || align=left | Disc.: NEAT || 
|- id="2003 SX456" bgcolor=#d6d6d6
| 0 ||  || MBA-O || 16.8 || 2.4 km || multiple || 2003–2020 || 31 Jul 2020 || 26 || align=left | Disc.: Spacewatch || 
|- id="2003 SY456" bgcolor=#fefefe
| 0 ||  || MBA-I || 19.1 || data-sort-value="0.45" | 450 m || multiple || 2003–2019 || 26 Oct 2019 || 34 || align=left | Disc.: Spacewatch || 
|- id="2003 SZ456" bgcolor=#E9E9E9
| 2 ||  || MBA-M || 19.0 || data-sort-value="0.47" | 470 m || multiple || 2003–2019 || 29 Sep 2019 || 33 || align=left | Disc.: Spacewatch || 
|- id="2003 SA457" bgcolor=#fefefe
| 0 ||  || MBA-I || 19.3 || data-sort-value="0.41" | 410 m || multiple || 2003–2019 || 24 Oct 2019 || 27 || align=left | Disc.: SDSS || 
|- id="2003 SB457" bgcolor=#d6d6d6
| 1 ||  || MBA-O || 17.4 || 1.8 km || multiple || 2003–2019 || 01 Oct 2019 || 33 || align=left | Disc.: Spacewatch || 
|- id="2003 SC457" bgcolor=#d6d6d6
| 1 ||  || MBA-O || 16.3 || 3.1 km || multiple || 2003–2020 || 08 Dec 2020 || 25 || align=left | Disc.: Spacewatch || 
|- id="2003 SD457" bgcolor=#E9E9E9
| 1 ||  || MBA-M || 17.96 || 1.4 km || multiple || 2003–2021 || 09 Nov 2021 || 53 || align=left | Disc.: LPL/Spacewatch II || 
|- id="2003 SE457" bgcolor=#fefefe
| 1 ||  || MBA-I || 19.56 || data-sort-value="0.36" | 360 m || multiple || 2003–2021 || 06 Jan 2021 || 24 || align=left | Disc.: SDSS || 
|- id="2003 SF457" bgcolor=#d6d6d6
| 0 ||  || MBA-O || 17.5 || 1.8 km || multiple || 2003–2020 || 21 Nov 2020 || 96 || align=left | Disc.: Spacewatch || 
|- id="2003 SG457" bgcolor=#d6d6d6
| 0 ||  || MBA-O || 16.8 || 2.4 km || multiple || 2003–2019 || 02 Oct 2019 || 97 || align=left | Disc.: Spacewatch || 
|- id="2003 SH457" bgcolor=#E9E9E9
| 0 ||  || MBA-M || 17.0 || 1.7 km || multiple || 2003–2020 || 08 Dec 2020 || 140 || align=left | Disc.: SpacewatchAlt.: 2010 KR109 || 
|- id="2003 SJ457" bgcolor=#d6d6d6
| 0 ||  || MBA-O || 17.2 || 2.0 km || multiple || 2003–2019 || 06 Sep 2019 || 108 || align=left | Disc.: SDSS || 
|- id="2003 SO457" bgcolor=#E9E9E9
| 0 ||  || MBA-M || 16.9 || 1.2 km || multiple || 1995–2021 || 08 Jan 2021 || 142 || align=left | Disc.: NEAT || 
|- id="2003 SP457" bgcolor=#d6d6d6
| 0 ||  || MBA-O || 16.3 || 3.1 km || multiple || 1996–2020 || 22 Nov 2020 || 81 || align=left | Disc.: SpacewatchAlt.: 1996 EW6 || 
|- id="2003 SQ457" bgcolor=#fefefe
| 0 ||  || MBA-I || 18.1 || data-sort-value="0.71" | 710 m || multiple || 1996–2020 || 16 Sep 2020 || 91 || align=left | Disc.: Spacewatch || 
|- id="2003 SR457" bgcolor=#d6d6d6
| 0 ||  || MBA-O || 16.7 || 2.5 km || multiple || 1998–2019 || 02 Dec 2019 || 75 || align=left | Disc.: SpacewatchAlt.: 1998 SU7 || 
|- id="2003 SS457" bgcolor=#d6d6d6
| 0 ||  || MBA-O || 17.1 || 2.1 km || multiple || 2003–2019 || 28 Dec 2019 || 69 || align=left | Disc.: Spacewatch || 
|- id="2003 ST457" bgcolor=#d6d6d6
| 0 ||  || MBA-O || 16.8 || 2.4 km || multiple || 2003–2020 || 23 Nov 2020 || 68 || align=left | Disc.: Spacewatch || 
|- id="2003 SU457" bgcolor=#d6d6d6
| 0 ||  || MBA-O || 16.1 || 3.4 km || multiple || 2003–2021 || 04 Jan 2021 || 117 || align=left | Disc.: SpacewatchAlt.: 2010 BY117 || 
|- id="2003 SV457" bgcolor=#d6d6d6
| 0 ||  || MBA-O || 16.7 || 2.5 km || multiple || 2003–2019 || 31 Dec 2019 || 69 || align=left | Disc.: Spacewatch || 
|- id="2003 SX457" bgcolor=#d6d6d6
| 0 ||  || MBA-O || 16.7 || 2.5 km || multiple || 2003–2020 || 10 Dec 2020 || 68 || align=left | Disc.: Spacewatch || 
|- id="2003 SY457" bgcolor=#fefefe
| 0 ||  || MBA-I || 18.6 || data-sort-value="0.57" | 570 m || multiple || 2003–2021 || 15 Jan 2021 || 63 || align=left | Disc.: NEAT || 
|- id="2003 SZ457" bgcolor=#fefefe
| 0 ||  || MBA-I || 18.5 || data-sort-value="0.59" | 590 m || multiple || 2003–2019 || 25 Jul 2019 || 56 || align=left | Disc.: SDSS || 
|- id="2003 SA458" bgcolor=#d6d6d6
| 0 ||  || MBA-O || 17.27 || 2.0 km || multiple || 2003–2021 || 06 Apr 2021 || 84 || align=left | Disc.: Spacewatch || 
|- id="2003 SC458" bgcolor=#E9E9E9
| 2 ||  || MBA-M || 18.6 || data-sort-value="0.57" | 570 m || multiple || 2003–2019 || 26 Sep 2019 || 54 || align=left | Disc.: Spacewatch || 
|- id="2003 SD458" bgcolor=#d6d6d6
| 0 ||  || MBA-O || 16.7 || 2.5 km || multiple || 2003–2020 || 23 Oct 2020 || 173 || align=left | Disc.: Spacewatch || 
|- id="2003 SE458" bgcolor=#d6d6d6
| 0 ||  || MBA-O || 16.94 || 2.3 km || multiple || 2003–2022 || 25 Jan 2022 || 60 || align=left | Disc.: Spacewatch || 
|- id="2003 SF458" bgcolor=#fefefe
| 0 ||  || MBA-I || 18.2 || data-sort-value="0.68" | 680 m || multiple || 2003–2020 || 15 Oct 2020 || 89 || align=left | Disc.: LPL/Spacewatch II || 
|- id="2003 SG458" bgcolor=#E9E9E9
| 0 ||  || MBA-M || 18.19 || data-sort-value="0.97" | 970 m || multiple || 2003–2019 || 20 Aug 2019 || 52 || align=left | Disc.: Spacewatch || 
|- id="2003 SH458" bgcolor=#d6d6d6
| 0 ||  || MBA-O || 17.0 || 2.2 km || multiple || 2003–2019 || 03 Dec 2019 || 62 || align=left | Disc.: NEAT || 
|- id="2003 SJ458" bgcolor=#d6d6d6
| 0 ||  || MBA-O || 16.85 || 2.4 km || multiple || 2003–2022 || 25 Jan 2022 || 74 || align=left | Disc.: Spacewatch || 
|- id="2003 SL458" bgcolor=#d6d6d6
| 0 ||  || MBA-O || 16.57 || 2.7 km || multiple || 2003–2022 || 25 Jan 2022 || 84 || align=left | Disc.: SDSS || 
|- id="2003 SM458" bgcolor=#fefefe
| 0 ||  || MBA-I || 18.44 || data-sort-value="0.61" | 610 m || multiple || 2003–2021 || 11 May 2021 || 87 || align=left | Disc.: LPL/Spacewatch II || 
|- id="2003 SP458" bgcolor=#fefefe
| 0 ||  || MBA-I || 18.05 || data-sort-value="0.73" | 730 m || multiple || 2003–2021 || 11 Nov 2021 || 58 || align=left | Disc.: Spacewatch || 
|- id="2003 SQ458" bgcolor=#d6d6d6
| 0 ||  || MBA-O || 16.6 || 2.7 km || multiple || 2003–2021 || 06 Jan 2021 || 100 || align=left | Disc.: Spacewatch || 
|- id="2003 SR458" bgcolor=#d6d6d6
| 0 ||  || MBA-O || 17.06 || 2.2 km || multiple || 2003–2019 || 06 Sep 2019 || 49 || align=left | Disc.: SDSS || 
|- id="2003 ST458" bgcolor=#d6d6d6
| 0 ||  || MBA-O || 16.9 || 2.3 km || multiple || 2003–2020 || 07 Dec 2020 || 57 || align=left | Disc.: Spacewatch || 
|- id="2003 SV458" bgcolor=#E9E9E9
| 1 ||  || MBA-M || 18.1 || data-sort-value="0.71" | 710 m || multiple || 2003–2019 || 01 Nov 2019 || 71 || align=left | Disc.: SDSSAlt.: 2019 QG29 || 
|- id="2003 SW458" bgcolor=#E9E9E9
| 0 ||  || MBA-M || 17.1 || 1.1 km || multiple || 2003–2021 || 07 Jan 2021 || 90 || align=left | Disc.: Spacewatch || 
|- id="2003 SX458" bgcolor=#d6d6d6
| 0 ||  || MBA-O || 17.0 || 2.2 km || multiple || 2003–2020 || 23 Nov 2020 || 64 || align=left | Disc.: Spacewatch || 
|- id="2003 SY458" bgcolor=#E9E9E9
| 0 ||  || MBA-M || 18.3 || data-sort-value="0.65" | 650 m || multiple || 2003–2019 || 24 Sep 2019 || 68 || align=left | Disc.: Spacewatch || 
|- id="2003 SZ458" bgcolor=#d6d6d6
| 0 ||  || MBA-O || 16.4 || 2.9 km || multiple || 2003–2019 || 28 Aug 2019 || 46 || align=left | Disc.: SDSS || 
|- id="2003 SA459" bgcolor=#d6d6d6
| 0 ||  || MBA-O || 17.3 || 1.9 km || multiple || 2003–2019 || 05 Aug 2019 || 51 || align=left | Disc.: NEAT || 
|- id="2003 SB459" bgcolor=#E9E9E9
| 0 ||  || MBA-M || 17.65 || 1.6 km || multiple || 2003–2021 || 14 Aug 2021 || 79 || align=left | Disc.: Spacewatch || 
|- id="2003 SC459" bgcolor=#d6d6d6
| 0 ||  || MBA-O || 17.1 || 2.1 km || multiple || 2003–2019 || 30 Sep 2019 || 49 || align=left | Disc.: Spacewatch || 
|- id="2003 SD459" bgcolor=#E9E9E9
| 0 ||  || MBA-M || 17.6 || data-sort-value="0.90" | 900 m || multiple || 1998–2020 || 16 Nov 2020 || 54 || align=left | Disc.: Spacewatch || 
|- id="2003 SE459" bgcolor=#d6d6d6
| 0 ||  || MBA-O || 16.6 || 2.7 km || multiple || 2003–2019 || 25 Sep 2019 || 44 || align=left | Disc.: Spacewatch || 
|- id="2003 SG459" bgcolor=#d6d6d6
| 0 ||  || MBA-O || 16.92 || 2.3 km || multiple || 2003–2022 || 25 Jan 2022 || 48 || align=left | Disc.: Spacewatch || 
|- id="2003 SH459" bgcolor=#d6d6d6
| 0 ||  || MBA-O || 17.2 || 2.0 km || multiple || 2003–2019 || 26 Sep 2019 || 60 || align=left | Disc.: LPL/Spacewatch II || 
|- id="2003 SK459" bgcolor=#E9E9E9
| 0 ||  || MBA-M || 17.7 || data-sort-value="0.86" | 860 m || multiple || 1995–2021 || 18 Jan 2021 || 55 || align=left | Disc.: LPL/Spacewatch II || 
|- id="2003 SL459" bgcolor=#d6d6d6
| 0 ||  || MBA-O || 17.7 || 1.6 km || multiple || 2003–2019 || 03 Oct 2019 || 46 || align=left | Disc.: Spacewatch || 
|- id="2003 SM459" bgcolor=#E9E9E9
| 1 ||  || MBA-M || 18.2 || data-sort-value="0.68" | 680 m || multiple || 2003–2019 || 27 Oct 2019 || 44 || align=left | Disc.: NEAT || 
|- id="2003 SP459" bgcolor=#d6d6d6
| 0 ||  || MBA-O || 17.2 || 2.0 km || multiple || 2003–2020 || 10 Dec 2020 || 49 || align=left | Disc.: Spacewatch || 
|- id="2003 SQ459" bgcolor=#E9E9E9
| 0 ||  || MBA-M || 17.9 || data-sort-value="0.78" | 780 m || multiple || 2003–2020 || 06 Dec 2020 || 72 || align=left | Disc.: Spacewatch || 
|- id="2003 SR459" bgcolor=#d6d6d6
| 0 ||  || MBA-O || 16.9 || 2.3 km || multiple || 2003–2020 || 16 Nov 2020 || 50 || align=left | Disc.: Spacewatch || 
|- id="2003 SS459" bgcolor=#E9E9E9
| 0 ||  || MBA-M || 17.10 || 2.1 km || multiple || 2003–2021 || 08 Sep 2021 || 59 || align=left | Disc.: Spacewatch || 
|- id="2003 ST459" bgcolor=#fefefe
| 0 ||  || MBA-I || 18.80 || data-sort-value="0.52" | 520 m || multiple || 1996–2021 || 27 Oct 2021 || 66 || align=left | Disc.: Spacewatch || 
|- id="2003 SU459" bgcolor=#E9E9E9
| 0 ||  || MBA-M || 18.14 || data-sort-value="0.99" | 990 m || multiple || 2003–2022 || 06 Jan 2022 || 41 || align=left | Disc.: LPL/Spacewatch II || 
|- id="2003 SV459" bgcolor=#d6d6d6
| 0 ||  || MBA-O || 17.3 || 1.9 km || multiple || 2003–2020 || 07 Dec 2020 || 67 || align=left | Disc.: Spacewatch || 
|- id="2003 SX459" bgcolor=#d6d6d6
| 0 ||  || MBA-O || 17.1 || 2.1 km || multiple || 2003–2019 || 01 Oct 2019 || 42 || align=left | Disc.: Spacewatch || 
|- id="2003 SY459" bgcolor=#E9E9E9
| 2 ||  || MBA-M || 18.1 || data-sort-value="0.71" | 710 m || multiple || 1999–2019 || 23 Oct 2019 || 50 || align=left | Disc.: Spacewatch || 
|- id="2003 SZ459" bgcolor=#E9E9E9
| 0 ||  || MBA-M || 17.42 || 1.8 km || multiple || 2003–2021 || 05 Oct 2021 || 68 || align=left | Disc.: Spacewatch || 
|- id="2003 SA460" bgcolor=#fefefe
| 0 ||  || MBA-I || 18.83 || data-sort-value="0.51" | 510 m || multiple || 2003–2021 || 28 Nov 2021 || 51 || align=left | Disc.: SDSS || 
|- id="2003 SD460" bgcolor=#fefefe
| 0 ||  || HUN || 19.2 || data-sort-value="0.43" | 430 m || multiple || 2003–2019 || 03 Sep 2019 || 32 || align=left | Disc.: Spacewatch || 
|- id="2003 SF460" bgcolor=#fefefe
| 0 ||  || MBA-I || 18.94 || data-sort-value="0.48" | 480 m || multiple || 2003–2021 || 11 Jun 2021 || 55 || align=left | Disc.: Mauna Kea Obs. || 
|- id="2003 SH460" bgcolor=#E9E9E9
| 0 ||  || MBA-M || 17.41 || 1.8 km || multiple || 2003–2021 || 11 Sep 2021 || 47 || align=left | Disc.: Spacewatch || 
|- id="2003 SJ460" bgcolor=#E9E9E9
| 2 ||  || MBA-M || 18.5 || data-sort-value="0.59" | 590 m || multiple || 2003–2020 || 09 Dec 2020 || 36 || align=left | Disc.: SDSS || 
|- id="2003 SK460" bgcolor=#FA8072
| 0 ||  || MCA || 20.1 || data-sort-value="0.28" | 280 m || multiple || 2003–2019 || 03 Oct 2019 || 44 || align=left | Disc.: LPL/Spacewatch II || 
|- id="2003 SL460" bgcolor=#d6d6d6
| 0 ||  || MBA-O || 16.7 || 2.5 km || multiple || 2003–2019 || 23 Aug 2019 || 32 || align=left | Disc.: LPL/Spacewatch II || 
|- id="2003 SM460" bgcolor=#E9E9E9
| 2 ||  || MBA-M || 19.0 || data-sort-value="0.47" | 470 m || multiple || 2003–2019 || 29 Jul 2019 || 25 || align=left | Disc.: Spacewatch || 
|- id="2003 SO460" bgcolor=#fefefe
| 0 ||  || MBA-I || 18.7 || data-sort-value="0.54" | 540 m || multiple || 2003–2020 || 17 Nov 2020 || 47 || align=left | Disc.: Spacewatch || 
|- id="2003 SP460" bgcolor=#d6d6d6
| 0 ||  || MBA-O || 17.4 || 1.8 km || multiple || 2003–2020 || 12 Dec 2020 || 32 || align=left | Disc.: LPL/Spacewatch II || 
|- id="2003 SQ460" bgcolor=#fefefe
| 0 ||  || MBA-I || 18.9 || data-sort-value="0.49" | 490 m || multiple || 2003–2020 || 17 Nov 2020 || 50 || align=left | Disc.: SpacewatchAlt.: 2003 SE473 || 
|- id="2003 SS460" bgcolor=#d6d6d6
| 2 ||  || MBA-O || 17.6 || 1.7 km || multiple || 2003–2019 || 24 Aug 2019 || 27 || align=left | Disc.: Spacewatch || 
|- id="2003 ST460" bgcolor=#E9E9E9
| 0 ||  || MBA-M || 18.14 || data-sort-value="0.99" | 990 m || multiple || 2003–2021 || 28 Nov 2021 || 57 || align=left | Disc.: Spacewatch || 
|- id="2003 SU460" bgcolor=#E9E9E9
| 1 ||  || MBA-M || 18.6 || data-sort-value="0.57" | 570 m || multiple || 2003–2019 || 05 Jul 2019 || 82 || align=left | Disc.: Spacewatch || 
|- id="2003 SV460" bgcolor=#fefefe
| 1 ||  || MBA-I || 19.42 || data-sort-value="0.39" | 390 m || multiple || 2003–2021 || 06 Nov 2021 || 68 || align=left | Disc.: SDSSAlt.: 2003 SK473 || 
|- id="2003 SW460" bgcolor=#d6d6d6
| 0 ||  || MBA-O || 16.93 || 2.3 km || multiple || 2003–2021 || 10 Apr 2021 || 85 || align=left | Disc.: SDSS || 
|- id="2003 SX460" bgcolor=#d6d6d6
| 0 ||  || MBA-O || 16.7 || 2.5 km || multiple || 2003–2019 || 24 Dec 2019 || 74 || align=left | Disc.: Spacewatch || 
|- id="2003 SY460" bgcolor=#d6d6d6
| 0 ||  || MBA-O || 16.9 || 2.3 km || multiple || 2003–2019 || 27 Sep 2019 || 67 || align=left | Disc.: LPL/Spacewatch II || 
|- id="2003 SZ460" bgcolor=#d6d6d6
| 0 ||  || MBA-O || 16.61 || 2.7 km || multiple || 2001–2021 || 14 Apr 2021 || 124 || align=left | Disc.: Spacewatch || 
|- id="2003 SA461" bgcolor=#d6d6d6
| 0 ||  || MBA-O || 17.47 || 1.8 km || multiple || 2003–2021 || 07 Apr 2021 || 62 || align=left | Disc.: Spacewatch || 
|- id="2003 SB461" bgcolor=#E9E9E9
| 0 ||  || MBA-M || 17.53 || 1.7 km || multiple || 2003–2021 || 30 Jun 2021 || 74 || align=left | Disc.: LPL/Spacewatch II || 
|- id="2003 SC461" bgcolor=#E9E9E9
| 2 ||  || MBA-M || 18.9 || data-sort-value="0.49" | 490 m || multiple || 2003–2019 || 26 Sep 2019 || 50 || align=left | Disc.: Spacewatch || 
|- id="2003 SD461" bgcolor=#d6d6d6
| 0 ||  || MBA-O || 16.9 || 2.3 km || multiple || 2003–2020 || 19 Nov 2020 || 85 || align=left | Disc.: SpacewatchAlt.: 2010 CP204 || 
|- id="2003 SE461" bgcolor=#fefefe
| 0 ||  || MBA-I || 18.3 || data-sort-value="0.65" | 650 m || multiple || 2003–2019 || 30 Dec 2019 || 51 || align=left | Disc.: SDSS || 
|- id="2003 SF461" bgcolor=#d6d6d6
| 0 ||  || MBA-O || 16.83 || 2.4 km || multiple || 2003–2022 || 26 Jan 2022 || 69 || align=left | Disc.: Spacewatch || 
|- id="2003 SG461" bgcolor=#d6d6d6
| 0 ||  || HIL || 15.8 || 3.9 km || multiple || 2003–2021 || 04 Jan 2021 || 59 || align=left | Disc.: Spacewatch || 
|- id="2003 SH461" bgcolor=#d6d6d6
| 0 ||  || MBA-O || 17.2 || 2.0 km || multiple || 2003–2021 || 18 Jan 2021 || 47 || align=left | Disc.: Spacewatch || 
|- id="2003 SK461" bgcolor=#d6d6d6
| 0 ||  || MBA-O || 17.37 || 1.9 km || multiple || 2003–2022 || 27 Jan 2022 || 78 || align=left | Disc.: Spacewatch || 
|- id="2003 SL461" bgcolor=#d6d6d6
| 0 ||  || MBA-O || 17.3 || 1.9 km || multiple || 2003–2019 || 04 Dec 2019 || 47 || align=left | Disc.: SDSS || 
|- id="2003 SM461" bgcolor=#fefefe
| 0 ||  || MBA-I || 18.7 || data-sort-value="0.54" | 540 m || multiple || 2003–2019 || 02 Oct 2019 || 41 || align=left | Disc.: Spacewatch || 
|- id="2003 SQ461" bgcolor=#fefefe
| 0 ||  || MBA-I || 19.4 || data-sort-value="0.39" | 390 m || multiple || 2003–2019 || 03 Sep 2019 || 46 || align=left | Disc.: Spacewatch || 
|- id="2003 SR461" bgcolor=#E9E9E9
| 0 ||  || MBA-M || 17.6 || data-sort-value="0.90" | 900 m || multiple || 2003–2021 || 17 Jan 2021 || 51 || align=left | Disc.: NEAT || 
|- id="2003 SS461" bgcolor=#fefefe
| 0 ||  || MBA-I || 18.69 || data-sort-value="0.54" | 540 m || multiple || 2003–2022 || 26 Jan 2022 || 71 || align=left | Disc.: Spacewatch || 
|- id="2003 ST461" bgcolor=#d6d6d6
| 0 ||  || MBA-O || 17.0 || 2.2 km || multiple || 2003–2020 || 10 Oct 2020 || 46 || align=left | Disc.: SDSS || 
|- id="2003 SU461" bgcolor=#d6d6d6
| 0 ||  || MBA-O || 16.8 || 2.4 km || multiple || 2003–2020 || 15 Oct 2020 || 67 || align=left | Disc.: Spacewatch || 
|- id="2003 SV461" bgcolor=#d6d6d6
| 0 ||  || MBA-O || 17.1 || 2.1 km || multiple || 2003–2019 || 22 Sep 2019 || 38 || align=left | Disc.: Spacewatch || 
|- id="2003 SW461" bgcolor=#E9E9E9
| 1 ||  || MBA-M || 17.9 || data-sort-value="0.78" | 780 m || multiple || 2003–2019 || 23 Aug 2019 || 31 || align=left | Disc.: NEAT || 
|- id="2003 SX461" bgcolor=#d6d6d6
| 0 ||  || MBA-O || 17.1 || 2.1 km || multiple || 2003–2021 || 14 Jan 2021 || 39 || align=left | Disc.: Spacewatch || 
|- id="2003 SY461" bgcolor=#d6d6d6
| 1 ||  || MBA-O || 18.2 || 1.3 km || multiple || 2003–2019 || 03 Oct 2019 || 30 || align=left | Disc.: SDSS || 
|- id="2003 SZ461" bgcolor=#fefefe
| 0 ||  || MBA-I || 18.0 || data-sort-value="0.75" | 750 m || multiple || 2003–2020 || 23 Jan 2020 || 32 || align=left | Disc.: Spacewatch || 
|- id="2003 SA462" bgcolor=#d6d6d6
| 0 ||  || MBA-O || 17.5 || 1.8 km || multiple || 2003–2019 || 02 Oct 2019 || 33 || align=left | Disc.: Spacewatch || 
|- id="2003 SB462" bgcolor=#d6d6d6
| 0 ||  || MBA-O || 17.5 || 1.8 km || multiple || 2003–2020 || 17 Nov 2020 || 37 || align=left | Disc.: LPL/Spacewatch II || 
|- id="2003 SC462" bgcolor=#d6d6d6
| 0 ||  || MBA-O || 17.1 || 2.1 km || multiple || 2003–2019 || 03 Oct 2019 || 29 || align=left | Disc.: LPL/Spacewatch II || 
|- id="2003 SD462" bgcolor=#E9E9E9
| 0 ||  || MBA-M || 17.94 || 1.4 km || multiple || 2003–2021 || 12 Sep 2021 || 66 || align=left | Disc.: Spacewatch || 
|- id="2003 SE462" bgcolor=#d6d6d6
| 1 ||  || MBA-O || 17.5 || 1.8 km || multiple || 2003–2019 || 29 Sep 2019 || 27 || align=left | Disc.: Spacewatch || 
|- id="2003 SF462" bgcolor=#E9E9E9
| 0 ||  || MBA-M || 18.13 || data-sort-value="0.99" | 990 m || multiple || 2003–2022 || 25 Jan 2022 || 41 || align=left | Disc.: Spacewatch || 
|- id="2003 SG462" bgcolor=#E9E9E9
| 3 ||  || MBA-M || 19.3 || data-sort-value="0.58" | 580 m || multiple || 2003–2016 || 25 Oct 2016 || 19 || align=left | Disc.: Spacewatch || 
|- id="2003 SH462" bgcolor=#E9E9E9
| 2 ||  || MBA-M || 17.9 || 1.5 km || multiple || 2003–2017 || 10 Oct 2017 || 36 || align=left | Disc.: LPL/Spacewatch II || 
|- id="2003 SJ462" bgcolor=#d6d6d6
| 4 ||  || MBA-O || 17.6 || 1.7 km || multiple || 2003–2019 || 27 Oct 2019 || 22 || align=left | Disc.: LPL/Spacewatch II || 
|- id="2003 SK462" bgcolor=#E9E9E9
| 3 ||  || MBA-M || 19.2 || data-sort-value="0.80" | 800 m || multiple || 2003–2017 || 28 Oct 2017 || 20 || align=left | Disc.: Spacewatch || 
|- id="2003 SM462" bgcolor=#d6d6d6
| 0 ||  || MBA-O || 17.35 || 1.9 km || multiple || 2003–2021 || 07 Apr 2021 || 65 || align=left | Disc.: Spacewatch || 
|- id="2003 SO462" bgcolor=#d6d6d6
| 0 ||  || MBA-O || 17.2 || 2.0 km || multiple || 2003–2020 || 21 Jan 2020 || 54 || align=left | Disc.: Spacewatch || 
|- id="2003 SQ462" bgcolor=#fefefe
| 0 ||  || MBA-I || 18.1 || data-sort-value="0.71" | 710 m || multiple || 2003–2020 || 25 Feb 2020 || 61 || align=left | Disc.: LPL/Spacewatch II || 
|- id="2003 SR462" bgcolor=#E9E9E9
| 0 ||  || MBA-M || 17.20 || 2.0 km || multiple || 2003–2019 || 13 Jan 2019 || 61 || align=left | Disc.: Spacewatch || 
|- id="2003 SS462" bgcolor=#fefefe
| 0 ||  || MBA-I || 17.7 || data-sort-value="0.86" | 860 m || multiple || 2003–2021 || 15 Jan 2021 || 48 || align=left | Disc.: Spacewatch || 
|- id="2003 ST462" bgcolor=#fefefe
| 1 ||  || MBA-I || 18.4 || data-sort-value="0.62" | 620 m || multiple || 2003–2020 || 24 Mar 2020 || 56 || align=left | Disc.: Mauna Kea Obs. || 
|- id="2003 SU462" bgcolor=#fefefe
| 1 ||  || HUN || 18.9 || data-sort-value="0.49" | 490 m || multiple || 1995–2019 || 29 Nov 2019 || 47 || align=left | Disc.: Spacewatch || 
|- id="2003 SW462" bgcolor=#d6d6d6
| 0 ||  || MBA-O || 16.96 || 2.3 km || multiple || 2003–2021 || 28 Nov 2021 || 95 || align=left | Disc.: Spacewatch || 
|- id="2003 SX462" bgcolor=#fefefe
| 0 ||  || MBA-I || 19.26 || data-sort-value="0.42" | 420 m || multiple || 2003–2021 || 07 Apr 2021 || 36 || align=left | Disc.: Spacewatch || 
|- id="2003 SY462" bgcolor=#d6d6d6
| 0 ||  || MBA-O || 17.0 || 2.2 km || multiple || 2003–2021 || 24 Jan 2021 || 48 || align=left | Disc.: Spacewatch || 
|- id="2003 SZ462" bgcolor=#d6d6d6
| 0 ||  || MBA-O || 17.2 || 2.0 km || multiple || 2003–2019 || 19 Nov 2019 || 49 || align=left | Disc.: Spacewatch || 
|- id="2003 SB463" bgcolor=#d6d6d6
| 0 ||  || MBA-O || 17.7 || 1.6 km || multiple || 2003–2019 || 28 Nov 2019 || 39 || align=left | Disc.: Spacewatch || 
|- id="2003 SC463" bgcolor=#fefefe
| 0 ||  || MBA-I || 18.5 || data-sort-value="0.59" | 590 m || multiple || 2003–2020 || 20 Oct 2020 || 121 || align=left | Disc.: NEAT || 
|- id="2003 SD463" bgcolor=#E9E9E9
| 0 ||  || MBA-M || 18.05 || 1.4 km || multiple || 2003–2021 || 06 Nov 2021 || 60 || align=left | Disc.: LPL/Spacewatch II || 
|- id="2003 SE463" bgcolor=#fefefe
| 0 ||  || MBA-I || 18.8 || data-sort-value="0.52" | 520 m || multiple || 2003–2018 || 15 Oct 2018 || 37 || align=left | Disc.: SDSS || 
|- id="2003 SG463" bgcolor=#E9E9E9
| 0 ||  || MBA-M || 18.36 || 1.2 km || multiple || 2003–2021 || 25 Nov 2021 || 71 || align=left | Disc.: LPL/Spacewatch II || 
|- id="2003 SH463" bgcolor=#fefefe
| 0 ||  || MBA-I || 17.9 || data-sort-value="0.78" | 780 m || multiple || 2003–2019 || 05 Nov 2019 || 54 || align=left | Disc.: SpacewatchAlt.: 2010 OU114 || 
|- id="2003 SJ463" bgcolor=#d6d6d6
| 0 ||  || MBA-O || 17.3 || 1.9 km || multiple || 2003–2020 || 16 Mar 2020 || 37 || align=left | Disc.: Spacewatch || 
|- id="2003 SK463" bgcolor=#E9E9E9
| 0 ||  || MBA-M || 17.76 || 1.6 km || multiple || 2003–2021 || 11 Sep 2021 || 57 || align=left | Disc.: Spacewatch || 
|- id="2003 SL463" bgcolor=#E9E9E9
| 0 ||  || MBA-M || 17.85 || 1.5 km || multiple || 2003–2021 || 08 Sep 2021 || 53 || align=left | Disc.: Spacewatch || 
|- id="2003 SM463" bgcolor=#d6d6d6
| 0 ||  || MBA-O || 17.3 || 1.9 km || multiple || 2003–2019 || 25 Oct 2019 || 33 || align=left | Disc.: LPL/Spacewatch II || 
|- id="2003 SN463" bgcolor=#d6d6d6
| 0 ||  || MBA-O || 17.0 || 2.2 km || multiple || 2003–2020 || 20 Oct 2020 || 71 || align=left | Disc.: Spacewatch || 
|- id="2003 SO463" bgcolor=#E9E9E9
| 0 ||  || MBA-M || 17.91 || 1.5 km || multiple || 2003–2021 || 26 Oct 2021 || 84 || align=left | Disc.: Spacewatch || 
|- id="2003 SQ463" bgcolor=#E9E9E9
| 1 ||  || MBA-M || 18.4 || data-sort-value="0.62" | 620 m || multiple || 2003–2019 || 29 Sep 2019 || 32 || align=left | Disc.: SDSS || 
|- id="2003 SR463" bgcolor=#d6d6d6
| 0 ||  || MBA-O || 17.6 || 1.7 km || multiple || 2003–2019 || 20 Dec 2019 || 38 || align=left | Disc.: SpacewatchAlt.: 2003 UD449 || 
|- id="2003 SS463" bgcolor=#d6d6d6
| 1 ||  || MBA-O || 17.3 || 1.9 km || multiple || 1998–2019 || 24 Dec 2019 || 38 || align=left | Disc.: Spacewatch || 
|- id="2003 ST463" bgcolor=#d6d6d6
| 0 ||  || MBA-O || 16.9 || 2.3 km || multiple || 2003–2020 || 10 Dec 2020 || 35 || align=left | Disc.: LPL/Spacewatch II || 
|- id="2003 SU463" bgcolor=#d6d6d6
| 1 ||  || MBA-O || 17.4 || 1.8 km || multiple || 2003–2020 || 19 Jan 2020 || 29 || align=left | Disc.: SDSS || 
|- id="2003 SV463" bgcolor=#d6d6d6
| 0 ||  || MBA-O || 17.3 || 1.9 km || multiple || 2003–2021 || 17 Jan 2021 || 47 || align=left | Disc.: Spacewatch || 
|- id="2003 SX463" bgcolor=#fefefe
| 1 ||  || MBA-I || 18.7 || data-sort-value="0.54" | 540 m || multiple || 2003–2020 || 15 Feb 2020 || 34 || align=left | Disc.: Spacewatch || 
|- id="2003 SY463" bgcolor=#fefefe
| 0 ||  || MBA-I || 18.41 || data-sort-value="0.62" | 620 m || multiple || 2003–2021 || 15 Apr 2021 || 43 || align=left | Disc.: LPL/Spacewatch II || 
|- id="2003 SA464" bgcolor=#d6d6d6
| 1 ||  || MBA-O || 17.6 || 1.7 km || multiple || 2003–2019 || 31 Dec 2019 || 26 || align=left | Disc.: Spacewatch || 
|- id="2003 SB464" bgcolor=#E9E9E9
| 2 ||  || MBA-M || 19.5 || data-sort-value="0.37" | 370 m || multiple || 2003–2019 || 28 Oct 2019 || 30 || align=left | Disc.: Spacewatch || 
|- id="2003 SC464" bgcolor=#fefefe
| 2 ||  || MBA-I || 18.9 || data-sort-value="0.49" | 490 m || multiple || 2003–2018 || 05 Aug 2018 || 20 || align=left | Disc.: Spacewatch || 
|- id="2003 SD464" bgcolor=#fefefe
| 0 ||  || MBA-I || 18.58 || data-sort-value="0.57" | 570 m || multiple || 2003–2021 || 26 Oct 2021 || 53 || align=left | Disc.: LPL/Spacewatch II || 
|- id="2003 SE464" bgcolor=#d6d6d6
| 2 ||  || MBA-O || 17.5 || 1.8 km || multiple || 2003–2020 || 23 Oct 2020 || 47 || align=left | Disc.: LPL/Spacewatch II || 
|- id="2003 SF464" bgcolor=#d6d6d6
| 0 ||  || HIL || 16.9 || 2.3 km || multiple || 2003–2019 || 19 Dec 2019 || 38 || align=left | Disc.: SpacewatchAdded on 22 July 2020 || 
|- id="2003 SG464" bgcolor=#fefefe
| 0 ||  || MBA-I || 18.62 || data-sort-value="0.56" | 560 m || multiple || 2003–2021 || 08 Sep 2021 || 43 || align=left | Disc.: LPL/Spacewatch IIAdded on 22 July 2020 || 
|- id="2003 SH464" bgcolor=#d6d6d6
| 0 ||  || MBA-O || 16.97 || 2.2 km || multiple || 2003–2021 || 04 Apr 2021 || 79 || align=left | Disc.: SpacewatchAdded on 22 July 2020 || 
|- id="2003 SJ464" bgcolor=#d6d6d6
| 0 ||  || MBA-O || 16.90 || 2.3 km || multiple || 2003–2022 || 10 Jan 2022 || 94 || align=left | Disc.: LPL/Spacewatch IIAdded on 22 July 2020Alt.: 2010 BM86 || 
|- id="2003 SK464" bgcolor=#d6d6d6
| 0 ||  || MBA-O || 16.9 || 2.3 km || multiple || 2003–2020 || 25 Mar 2020 || 60 || align=left | Disc.: LPL/Spacewatch IIAdded on 22 July 2020 || 
|- id="2003 SL464" bgcolor=#fefefe
| 1 ||  || MBA-I || 19.6 || data-sort-value="0.36" | 360 m || multiple || 2003–2019 || 28 Oct 2019 || 39 || align=left | Disc.: SpacewatchAdded on 22 July 2020 || 
|- id="2003 SM464" bgcolor=#E9E9E9
| 0 ||  || MBA-M || 18.08 || 1.3 km || multiple || 2003–2021 || 10 Oct 2021 || 55 || align=left | Disc.: SpacewatchAdded on 22 July 2020 || 
|- id="2003 SN464" bgcolor=#E9E9E9
| 4 ||  || MBA-M || 18.0 || 1.4 km || multiple || 2003–2017 || 10 Nov 2017 || 26 || align=left | Disc.: LPL/Spacewatch IIAdded on 22 July 2020 || 
|- id="2003 SO464" bgcolor=#d6d6d6
| 0 ||  || MBA-O || 17.4 || 1.8 km || multiple || 2003–2021 || 12 Feb 2021 || 33 || align=left | Disc.: SpacewatchAdded on 22 July 2020 || 
|- id="2003 SP464" bgcolor=#fefefe
| 0 ||  || MBA-I || 18.32 || data-sort-value="0.64" | 640 m || multiple || 2003–2021 || 30 Nov 2021 || 96 || align=left | Disc.: SpacewatchAdded on 22 July 2020 || 
|- id="2003 SR464" bgcolor=#d6d6d6
| 0 ||  || MBA-O || 16.9 || 2.3 km || multiple || 1998–2019 || 28 Dec 2019 || 49 || align=left | Disc.: SpacewatchAdded on 22 July 2020 || 
|- id="2003 SS464" bgcolor=#E9E9E9
| 1 ||  || MBA-M || 17.7 || data-sort-value="0.86" | 860 m || multiple || 2003–2020 || 11 Dec 2020 || 56 || align=left | Disc.: LPL/Spacewatch IIAdded on 22 July 2020 || 
|- id="2003 ST464" bgcolor=#d6d6d6
| 0 ||  || MBA-O || 16.67 || 2.6 km || multiple || 2003–2021 || 09 May 2021 || 87 || align=left | Disc.: SpacewatchAdded on 22 July 2020 || 
|- id="2003 SW464" bgcolor=#E9E9E9
| 0 ||  || MBA-M || 18.10 || 1.3 km || multiple || 2003–2021 || 08 Dec 2021 || 69 || align=left | Disc.: SpacewatchAdded on 22 July 2020 || 
|- id="2003 SX464" bgcolor=#fefefe
| 0 ||  || MBA-I || 18.05 || data-sort-value="0.73" | 730 m || multiple || 2003–2022 || 07 Jan 2022 || 110 || align=left | Disc.: NEATAdded on 22 July 2020 || 
|- id="2003 SY464" bgcolor=#d6d6d6
| 0 ||  || MBA-O || 17.6 || 1.7 km || multiple || 2000–2020 || 14 Dec 2020 || 57 || align=left | Disc.: SpacewatchAdded on 22 July 2020 || 
|- id="2003 SZ464" bgcolor=#d6d6d6
| 0 ||  || MBA-O || 17.3 || 1.9 km || multiple || 2003–2021 || 18 Jan 2021 || 40 || align=left | Disc.: SpacewatchAdded on 22 July 2020 || 
|- id="2003 SA465" bgcolor=#fefefe
| 1 ||  || MBA-I || 18.0 || data-sort-value="0.75" | 750 m || multiple || 2003–2017 || 16 Dec 2017 || 41 || align=left | Disc.: SpacewatchAdded on 22 July 2020 || 
|- id="2003 SB465" bgcolor=#E9E9E9
| 0 ||  || MBA-M || 17.5 || 1.3 km || multiple || 2003–2021 || 06 Jan 2021 || 101 || align=left | Disc.: SpacewatchAdded on 22 July 2020 || 
|- id="2003 SC465" bgcolor=#FA8072
| 0 ||  || MCA || 18.5 || data-sort-value="0.59" | 590 m || multiple || 2003–2020 || 06 Dec 2020 || 102 || align=left | Disc.: SpacewatchAdded on 22 July 2020 || 
|- id="2003 SD465" bgcolor=#d6d6d6
| 3 ||  || MBA-O || 18.1 || 1.3 km || multiple || 2003–2018 || 17 Nov 2018 || 40 || align=left | Disc.: SpacewatchAdded on 22 July 2020 || 
|- id="2003 SG465" bgcolor=#d6d6d6
| 3 ||  || MBA-O || 18.5 || 1.1 km || multiple || 2003–2018 || 29 Nov 2018 || 40 || align=left | Disc.: SpacewatchAdded on 22 July 2020 || 
|- id="2003 SH465" bgcolor=#E9E9E9
| 0 ||  || MBA-M || 18.09 || 1.3 km || multiple || 2003–2021 || 16 Jun 2021 || 47 || align=left | Disc.: CINEOSAdded on 22 July 2020 || 
|- id="2003 SJ465" bgcolor=#E9E9E9
| 0 ||  || MBA-M || 17.56 || 1.7 km || multiple || 2003–2021 || 31 Oct 2021 || 89 || align=left | Disc.: SpacewatchAdded on 22 July 2020 || 
|- id="2003 SK465" bgcolor=#d6d6d6
| 0 ||  || MBA-O || 17.85 || 1.5 km || multiple || 2003–2021 || 03 Apr 2021 || 27 || align=left | Disc.: SpacewatchAdded on 22 July 2020 || 
|- id="2003 SL465" bgcolor=#fefefe
| 0 ||  || MBA-I || 18.0 || data-sort-value="0.75" | 750 m || multiple || 2003–2021 || 17 Jan 2021 || 82 || align=left | Disc.: LPL/Spacewatch IIAdded on 22 July 2020 || 
|- id="2003 SN465" bgcolor=#fefefe
| 0 ||  || MBA-I || 18.51 || data-sort-value="0.59" | 590 m || multiple || 2003–2021 || 08 Sep 2021 || 40 || align=left | Disc.: SpacewatchAdded on 22 July 2020 || 
|- id="2003 SO465" bgcolor=#d6d6d6
| 0 ||  || MBA-O || 17.0 || 2.2 km || multiple || 2003–2020 || 19 Jan 2020 || 69 || align=left | Disc.: SpacewatchAdded on 22 July 2020 || 
|- id="2003 SR465" bgcolor=#d6d6d6
| 1 ||  || MBA-O || 17.4 || 1.8 km || multiple || 2003–2019 || 03 Oct 2019 || 28 || align=left | Disc.: SpacewatchAdded on 17 January 2021 || 
|- id="2003 SS465" bgcolor=#E9E9E9
| 0 ||  || MBA-M || 18.37 || data-sort-value="0.89" | 890 m || multiple || 2003–2021 || 01 Dec 2021 || 53 || align=left | Disc.: LPL/Spacewatch IIAdded on 13 September 2020 || 
|- id="2003 ST465" bgcolor=#E9E9E9
| 0 ||  || MBA-M || 17.8 || 1.2 km || multiple || 2003–2020 || 14 Oct 2020 || 79 || align=left | Disc.: SpacewatchAdded on 13 September 2020 || 
|- id="2003 SU465" bgcolor=#E9E9E9
| 0 ||  || MBA-M || 17.7 || 1.2 km || multiple || 2003–2020 || 11 Sep 2020 || 82 || align=left | Disc.: SpacewatchAdded on 13 September 2020 || 
|- id="2003 SV465" bgcolor=#fefefe
| 0 ||  || MBA-I || 18.04 || data-sort-value="0.73" | 730 m || multiple || 2003–2021 || 09 Dec 2021 || 84 || align=left | Disc.: LONEOSAdded on 13 September 2020 || 
|- id="2003 SW465" bgcolor=#fefefe
| 0 ||  || MBA-I || 18.8 || data-sort-value="0.52" | 520 m || multiple || 2003–2020 || 20 Oct 2020 || 93 || align=left | Disc.: SpacewatchAdded on 19 October 2020 || 
|- id="2003 SX465" bgcolor=#fefefe
| 0 ||  || MBA-I || 18.6 || data-sort-value="0.57" | 570 m || multiple || 2003–2019 || 07 Jun 2019 || 33 || align=left | Disc.: SpacewatchAdded on 19 October 2020 || 
|- id="2003 SY465" bgcolor=#fefefe
| 0 ||  || MBA-I || 19.37 || data-sort-value="0.40" | 400 m || multiple || 2003–2022 || 27 Jan 2022 || 55 || align=left | Disc.: LPL/Spacewatch IIAdded on 19 October 2020 || 
|- id="2003 SZ465" bgcolor=#fefefe
| 0 ||  || MBA-I || 18.9 || data-sort-value="0.49" | 490 m || multiple || 2002–2020 || 22 Aug 2020 || 45 || align=left | Disc.: LPL/Spacewatch IIAdded on 19 October 2020 || 
|- id="2003 SD466" bgcolor=#E9E9E9
| 0 ||  || MBA-M || 18.1 || 1.0 km || multiple || 2003–2020 || 16 Oct 2020 || 71 || align=left | Disc.: SpacewatchAdded on 19 October 2020 || 
|- id="2003 SG466" bgcolor=#fefefe
| 0 ||  || MBA-I || 18.76 || data-sort-value="0.53" | 530 m || multiple || 2003–2021 || 06 Apr 2021 || 58 || align=left | Disc.: SpacewatchAdded on 19 October 2020 || 
|- id="2003 SH466" bgcolor=#E9E9E9
| 0 ||  || MBA-M || 17.5 || 1.3 km || multiple || 2003–2020 || 10 Dec 2020 || 128 || align=left | Disc.: LONEOSAdded on 19 October 2020 || 
|- id="2003 SJ466" bgcolor=#E9E9E9
| 0 ||  || MBA-M || 18.0 || 1.1 km || multiple || 2003–2020 || 14 Sep 2020 || 45 || align=left | Disc.: SDSSAdded on 19 October 2020 || 
|- id="2003 SK466" bgcolor=#E9E9E9
| 1 ||  || MBA-M || 18.6 || data-sort-value="0.80" | 800 m || multiple || 2003–2020 || 15 Oct 2020 || 64 || align=left | Disc.: SpacewatchAdded on 19 October 2020 || 
|- id="2003 SL466" bgcolor=#d6d6d6
| 0 ||  || MBA-O || 16.98 || 2.2 km || multiple || 2003–2022 || 26 Jan 2022 || 52 || align=left | Disc.: SpacewatchAdded on 19 October 2020 || 
|- id="2003 SM466" bgcolor=#fefefe
| 0 ||  || MBA-I || 18.3 || data-sort-value="0.65" | 650 m || multiple || 2003–2021 || 04 Jan 2021 || 53 || align=left | Disc.: SpacewatchAdded on 19 October 2020 || 
|- id="2003 SN466" bgcolor=#E9E9E9
| 0 ||  || MBA-M || 17.4 || data-sort-value="0.98" | 980 m || multiple || 2003–2021 || 11 Jan 2021 || 96 || align=left | Disc.: SpacewatchAdded on 19 October 2020 || 
|- id="2003 SO466" bgcolor=#fefefe
| 0 ||  || MBA-I || 18.0 || data-sort-value="0.75" | 750 m || multiple || 2003–2018 || 18 Oct 2018 || 43 || align=left | Disc.: SpacewatchAdded on 19 October 2020 || 
|- id="2003 SP466" bgcolor=#fefefe
| 0 ||  || MBA-I || 18.7 || data-sort-value="0.54" | 540 m || multiple || 2003–2018 || 18 Oct 2018 || 37 || align=left | Disc.: SpacewatchAdded on 19 October 2020 || 
|- id="2003 SR466" bgcolor=#fefefe
| 2 ||  || MBA-I || 19.5 || data-sort-value="0.37" | 370 m || multiple || 2003–2020 || 23 Sep 2020 || 51 || align=left | Disc.: SpacewatchAdded on 19 October 2020 || 
|- id="2003 SS466" bgcolor=#fefefe
| 1 ||  || MBA-I || 19.0 || data-sort-value="0.47" | 470 m || multiple || 2003–2016 || 25 Oct 2016 || 29 || align=left | Disc.: CINEOSAdded on 19 October 2020 || 
|- id="2003 ST466" bgcolor=#fefefe
| 1 ||  || MBA-I || 18.03 || data-sort-value="0.74" | 740 m || multiple || 2003–2021 || 09 Apr 2021 || 40 || align=left | Disc.: NEATAdded on 19 October 2020 || 
|- id="2003 SU466" bgcolor=#d6d6d6
| 1 ||  || MBA-O || 17.6 || 1.7 km || multiple || 2003–2020 || 23 Sep 2020 || 46 || align=left | Disc.: SpacewatchAdded on 19 October 2020Alt.: 2010 CX204 || 
|- id="2003 SV466" bgcolor=#d6d6d6
| 2 ||  || MBA-O || 17.91 || 1.5 km || multiple || 2003–2021 || 08 May 2021 || 27 || align=left | Disc.: LPL/Spacewatch IIAdded on 19 October 2020 || 
|- id="2003 SW466" bgcolor=#E9E9E9
| 0 ||  || MBA-M || 18.6 || data-sort-value="0.80" | 800 m || multiple || 2003–2021 || 04 Jan 2021 || 62 || align=left | Disc.: SpacewatchAdded on 19 October 2020 || 
|- id="2003 SX466" bgcolor=#fefefe
| 2 ||  || MBA-I || 19.2 || data-sort-value="0.43" | 430 m || multiple || 2003–2018 || 09 Nov 2018 || 25 || align=left | Disc.: SpacewatchAdded on 19 October 2020 || 
|- id="2003 SY466" bgcolor=#E9E9E9
| 4 ||  || MBA-M || 18.4 || data-sort-value="0.88" | 880 m || multiple || 2003–2016 || 27 Oct 2016 || 16 || align=left | Disc.: SpacewatchAdded on 19 October 2020 || 
|- id="2003 SZ466" bgcolor=#fefefe
| 3 ||  || MBA-I || 19.2 || data-sort-value="0.43" | 430 m || multiple || 2003–2017 || 14 Nov 2017 || 28 || align=left | Disc.: SpacewatchAdded on 19 October 2020Alt.: 2010 NY143 || 
|- id="2003 SA467" bgcolor=#E9E9E9
| 0 ||  || MBA-M || 17.82 || 1.5 km || multiple || 2003–2021 || 03 Dec 2021 || 88 || align=left | Disc.: SDSSAdded on 19 October 2020Alt.: 2003 UE448 || 
|- id="2003 SB467" bgcolor=#E9E9E9
| 3 ||  || MBA-M || 18.2 || data-sort-value="0.96" | 960 m || multiple || 2003–2020 || 11 Oct 2020 || 55 || align=left | Disc.: SpacewatchAdded on 17 January 2021 || 
|- id="2003 SC467" bgcolor=#E9E9E9
| 0 ||  || MBA-M || 17.4 || 1.4 km || multiple || 2003–2020 || 13 Sep 2020 || 69 || align=left | Disc.: LPL/Spacewatch IIAdded on 17 January 2021 || 
|- id="2003 SD467" bgcolor=#E9E9E9
| 1 ||  || MBA-M || 19.1 || data-sort-value="0.64" | 640 m || multiple || 2003–2020 || 12 Sep 2020 || 30 || align=left | Disc.: SpacewatchAdded on 17 January 2021 || 
|- id="2003 SE467" bgcolor=#E9E9E9
| 2 ||  || MBA-M || 18.4 || data-sort-value="0.88" | 880 m || multiple || 2003–2020 || 13 Sep 2020 || 30 || align=left | Disc.: SpacewatchAdded on 17 January 2021 || 
|- id="2003 SF467" bgcolor=#E9E9E9
| 0 ||  || MBA-M || 18.0 || 1.1 km || multiple || 2003–2020 || 13 Nov 2020 || 85 || align=left | Disc.: SpacewatchAdded on 17 January 2021 || 
|- id="2003 SH467" bgcolor=#d6d6d6
| 0 ||  || MBA-O || 17.17 || 2.0 km || multiple || 2003–2022 || 08 Jan 2022 || 79 || align=left | Disc.: SpacewatchAdded on 17 January 2021Alt.: 2010 CG191 || 
|- id="2003 SJ467" bgcolor=#d6d6d6
| 0 ||  || MBA-O || 17.84 || 1.5 km || multiple || 2003–2021 || 19 May 2021 || 49 || align=left | Disc.: LPL/Spacewatch IIAdded on 17 January 2021 || 
|- id="2003 SK467" bgcolor=#fefefe
| 0 ||  || MBA-I || 19.0 || data-sort-value="0.47" | 470 m || multiple || 2003–2020 || 11 Dec 2020 || 76 || align=left | Disc.: SpacewatchAdded on 17 January 2021 || 
|- id="2003 SL467" bgcolor=#fefefe
| 0 ||  || MBA-I || 19.2 || data-sort-value="0.43" | 430 m || multiple || 2003–2020 || 06 Dec 2020 || 67 || align=left | Disc.: SpacewatchAdded on 17 January 2021 || 
|- id="2003 SM467" bgcolor=#E9E9E9
| 1 ||  || MBA-M || 18.1 || 1.0 km || multiple || 2003–2021 || 05 Jan 2021 || 70 || align=left | Disc.: SpacewatchAdded on 17 January 2021 || 
|- id="2003 SN467" bgcolor=#d6d6d6
| 0 ||  || MBA-O || 17.11 || 2.1 km || multiple || 2003–2022 || 11 Jan 2022 || 72 || align=left | Disc.: SpacewatchAdded on 17 January 2021Alt.: 2010 CV57 || 
|- id="2003 SO467" bgcolor=#d6d6d6
| 2 ||  || MBA-O || 16.6 || 2.7 km || multiple || 2003–2020 || 10 Nov 2020 || 57 || align=left | Disc.: NEATAdded on 17 January 2021 || 
|- id="2003 SP467" bgcolor=#d6d6d6
| 0 ||  || MBA-O || 17.02 || 2.2 km || multiple || 2003–2021 || 02 Dec 2021 || 49 || align=left | Disc.: SpacewatchAdded on 17 January 2021 || 
|- id="2003 SQ467" bgcolor=#fefefe
| 1 ||  || MBA-I || 19.0 || data-sort-value="0.47" | 470 m || multiple || 2003–2018 || 14 Aug 2018 || 25 || align=left | Disc.: SpacewatchAdded on 17 January 2021Alt.: 2007 VZ313 || 
|- id="2003 SR467" bgcolor=#d6d6d6
| 4 ||  || MBA-O || 17.8 || 1.5 km || multiple || 2003–2019 || 26 Sep 2019 || 16 || align=left | Disc.: SDSSAdded on 17 January 2021 || 
|- id="2003 ST467" bgcolor=#E9E9E9
| 0 ||  || MBA-M || 18.42 || data-sort-value="0.87" | 870 m || multiple || 2003–2022 || 25 Jan 2022 || 59 || align=left | Disc.: SpacewatchAdded on 17 January 2021 || 
|- id="2003 SU467" bgcolor=#E9E9E9
| 0 ||  || MBA-M || 17.82 || 1.1 km || multiple || 2003–2021 || 30 Nov 2021 || 77 || align=left | Disc.: SpacewatchAdded on 17 January 2021 || 
|- id="2003 SW467" bgcolor=#d6d6d6
| 0 ||  || MBA-O || 17.0 || 2.2 km || multiple || 2003–2020 || 09 Oct 2020 || 69 || align=left | Disc.: SpacewatchAdded on 17 January 2021Alt.: 2014 MC76 || 
|- id="2003 SX467" bgcolor=#FA8072
| 0 ||  || MCA || 18.9 || data-sort-value="0.49" | 490 m || multiple || 2003–2020 || 15 Sep 2020 || 28 || align=left | Disc.: SDSSAdded on 17 January 2021 || 
|- id="2003 SY467" bgcolor=#fefefe
| 1 ||  || MBA-I || 19.1 || data-sort-value="0.45" | 450 m || multiple || 2003–2020 || 24 Jun 2020 || 31 || align=left | Disc.: SpacewatchAdded on 17 January 2021 || 
|- id="2003 SZ467" bgcolor=#d6d6d6
| 0 ||  || MBA-O || 16.91 || 2.3 km || multiple || 2003–2022 || 22 Jan 2022 || 53 || align=left | Disc.: SpacewatchAdded on 17 January 2021 || 
|- id="2003 SA468" bgcolor=#fefefe
| 2 ||  || MBA-I || 18.0 || data-sort-value="0.75" | 750 m || multiple || 2003–2019 || 02 Dec 2019 || 21 || align=left | Disc.: SDSSAdded on 17 January 2021 || 
|- id="2003 SB468" bgcolor=#fefefe
| 0 ||  || MBA-I || 18.7 || data-sort-value="0.54" | 540 m || multiple || 2003–2020 || 08 Dec 2020 || 93 || align=left | Disc.: SpacewatchAdded on 17 January 2021 || 
|- id="2003 SC468" bgcolor=#fefefe
| 0 ||  || MBA-I || 19.1 || data-sort-value="0.45" | 450 m || multiple || 2003–2020 || 05 Nov 2020 || 68 || align=left | Disc.: SpacewatchAdded on 17 January 2021 || 
|- id="2003 SD468" bgcolor=#d6d6d6
| 1 ||  || MBA-O || 17.6 || 1.7 km || multiple || 2003–2020 || 26 Sep 2020 || 44 || align=left | Disc.: SpacewatchAdded on 17 January 2021Alt.: 2010 DC28 || 
|- id="2003 SE468" bgcolor=#d6d6d6
| 0 ||  || MBA-O || 17.22 || 2.0 km || multiple || 2003–2022 || 27 Jan 2022 || 109 || align=left | Disc.: SpacewatchAdded on 17 January 2021Alt.: 2010 BK63 || 
|- id="2003 SF468" bgcolor=#fefefe
| 0 ||  || MBA-I || 18.7 || data-sort-value="0.54" | 540 m || multiple || 2003–2020 || 26 Sep 2020 || 42 || align=left | Disc.: SpacewatchAdded on 17 January 2021 || 
|- id="2003 SG468" bgcolor=#d6d6d6
| 0 ||  || MBA-O || 16.7 || 2.5 km || multiple || 2003–2020 || 07 Dec 2020 || 59 || align=left | Disc.: SpacewatchAdded on 17 January 2021 || 
|- id="2003 SH468" bgcolor=#E9E9E9
| 1 ||  || MBA-M || 19.0 || data-sort-value="0.67" | 670 m || multiple || 2003–2020 || 15 Oct 2020 || 22 || align=left | Disc.: LPL/Spacewatch IIAdded on 17 January 2021 || 
|- id="2003 SJ468" bgcolor=#d6d6d6
| 0 ||  || MBA-O || 17.0 || 2.2 km || multiple || 2001–2020 || 17 Oct 2020 || 45 || align=left | Disc.: SpacewatchAdded on 17 January 2021 || 
|- id="2003 SL468" bgcolor=#d6d6d6
| 2 ||  || MBA-O || 17.1 || 2.1 km || multiple || 2003–2020 || 17 Oct 2020 || 38 || align=left | Disc.: SpacewatchAdded on 17 January 2021 || 
|- id="2003 SN468" bgcolor=#d6d6d6
| 0 ||  || MBA-O || 16.55 || 2.7 km || multiple || 2003–2022 || 23 Jan 2022 || 84 || align=left | Disc.: SpacewatchAdded on 17 January 2021 || 
|- id="2003 SP468" bgcolor=#E9E9E9
| 0 ||  || MBA-M || 18.2 || data-sort-value="0.68" | 680 m || multiple || 2003–2020 || 07 Dec 2020 || 55 || align=left | Disc.: SpacewatchAdded on 17 January 2021 || 
|- id="2003 SQ468" bgcolor=#FA8072
| 1 ||  || MCA || 19.7 || data-sort-value="0.34" | 340 m || multiple || 2003–2021 || 06 Jan 2021 || 49 || align=left | Disc.: SpacewatchAdded on 17 January 2021 || 
|- id="2003 SR468" bgcolor=#fefefe
| 3 ||  || MBA-I || 19.5 || data-sort-value="0.37" | 370 m || multiple || 2003–2019 || 04 Dec 2019 || 23 || align=left | Disc.: SpacewatchAdded on 17 January 2021 || 
|- id="2003 ST468" bgcolor=#E9E9E9
| 1 ||  || MBA-M || 17.9 || 1.1 km || multiple || 2003–2020 || 07 Nov 2020 || 68 || align=left | Disc.: SpacewatchAdded on 17 January 2021 || 
|- id="2003 SU468" bgcolor=#fefefe
| 0 ||  || MBA-I || 18.9 || data-sort-value="0.49" | 490 m || multiple || 2002–2020 || 17 Oct 2020 || 51 || align=left | Disc.: SpacewatchAdded on 17 January 2021 || 
|- id="2003 SV468" bgcolor=#E9E9E9
| 3 ||  || MBA-M || 18.4 || data-sort-value="0.88" | 880 m || multiple || 2003–2020 || 16 Oct 2020 || 50 || align=left | Disc.: SpacewatchAdded on 17 January 2021 || 
|- id="2003 SW468" bgcolor=#d6d6d6
| 0 ||  || MBA-O || 17.4 || 1.8 km || multiple || 2003–2020 || 17 Oct 2020 || 60 || align=left | Disc.: SpacewatchAdded on 17 January 2021 || 
|- id="2003 SY468" bgcolor=#d6d6d6
| 0 ||  || MBA-O || 17.8 || 1.5 km || multiple || 2003–2020 || 05 Nov 2020 || 56 || align=left | Disc.: SpacewatchAdded on 17 January 2021 || 
|- id="2003 SZ468" bgcolor=#E9E9E9
| 1 ||  || MBA-M || 17.8 || 1.2 km || multiple || 2003–2021 || 05 Jan 2021 || 55 || align=left | Disc.: LPL/Spacewatch IIAdded on 17 January 2021 || 
|- id="2003 SA469" bgcolor=#E9E9E9
| 0 ||  || MBA-M || 17.46 || 1.4 km || multiple || 2003–2022 || 27 Jan 2022 || 60 || align=left | Disc.: SpacewatchAdded on 17 January 2021 || 
|- id="2003 SB469" bgcolor=#d6d6d6
| 0 ||  || MBA-O || 16.8 || 2.4 km || multiple || 2003–2020 || 05 Nov 2020 || 51 || align=left | Disc.: SpacewatchAdded on 17 January 2021 || 
|- id="2003 SC469" bgcolor=#E9E9E9
| 1 ||  || MBA-M || 17.9 || 1.1 km || multiple || 2003–2021 || 05 Jan 2021 || 67 || align=left | Disc.: SpacewatchAdded on 17 January 2021 || 
|- id="2003 SD469" bgcolor=#E9E9E9
| 3 ||  || MBA-M || 18.3 || data-sort-value="0.92" | 920 m || multiple || 2003–2020 || 15 Oct 2020 || 34 || align=left | Disc.: SpacewatchAdded on 17 January 2021 || 
|- id="2003 SE469" bgcolor=#d6d6d6
| 0 ||  || MBA-O || 16.65 || 2.6 km || multiple || 2003–2022 || 27 Jan 2022 || 93 || align=left | Disc.: LONEOSAdded on 17 January 2021Alt.: 2010 CD11 || 
|- id="2003 SF469" bgcolor=#d6d6d6
| 0 ||  || MBA-O || 17.9 || 1.5 km || multiple || 2003–2019 || 05 Nov 2019 || 37 || align=left | Disc.: SpacewatchAdded on 17 January 2021 || 
|- id="2003 SH469" bgcolor=#E9E9E9
| 3 ||  || MBA-M || 19.3 || data-sort-value="0.58" | 580 m || multiple || 2003–2020 || 05 Nov 2020 || 32 || align=left | Disc.: LPL/Spacewatch IIAdded on 17 January 2021 || 
|- id="2003 SJ469" bgcolor=#E9E9E9
| 0 ||  || MBA-M || 18.0 || 1.1 km || multiple || 2003–2020 || 11 Dec 2020 || 66 || align=left | Disc.: SpacewatchAdded on 17 January 2021 || 
|- id="2003 SK469" bgcolor=#E9E9E9
| 2 ||  || MBA-M || 18.6 || 1.1 km || multiple || 2001–2017 || 27 Oct 2017 || 35 || align=left | Disc.: LPL/Spacewatch IIAdded on 17 January 2021 || 
|- id="2003 SL469" bgcolor=#E9E9E9
| 1 ||  || MBA-M || 18.2 || data-sort-value="0.96" | 960 m || multiple || 2003–2020 || 16 Dec 2020 || 58 || align=left | Disc.: LPL/Spacewatch IIAdded on 17 January 2021 || 
|- id="2003 SO469" bgcolor=#d6d6d6
| 2 ||  || MBA-O || 17.4 || 1.8 km || multiple || 2003–2020 || 10 Nov 2020 || 28 || align=left | Disc.: SpacewatchAdded on 17 January 2021 || 
|- id="2003 SP469" bgcolor=#E9E9E9
| 1 ||  || MBA-M || 18.14 || data-sort-value="0.99" | 990 m || multiple || 2003–2021 || 08 Jan 2021 || 51 || align=left | Disc.: SpacewatchAdded on 17 January 2021 || 
|- id="2003 SQ469" bgcolor=#E9E9E9
| 0 ||  || MBA-M || 17.9 || 1.1 km || multiple || 2003–2020 || 16 Dec 2020 || 59 || align=left | Disc.: SpacewatchAdded on 17 January 2021 || 
|- id="2003 SR469" bgcolor=#d6d6d6
| 1 ||  || MBA-O || 17.4 || 1.8 km || multiple || 2003–2020 || 08 Dec 2020 || 52 || align=left | Disc.: SpacewatchAdded on 17 January 2021 || 
|- id="2003 SS469" bgcolor=#d6d6d6
| 0 ||  || MBA-O || 18.2 || 1.3 km || multiple || 2003–2020 || 12 Nov 2020 || 35 || align=left | Disc.: SpacewatchAdded on 17 January 2021 || 
|- id="2003 SU469" bgcolor=#d6d6d6
| 0 ||  || MBA-O || 17.1 || 2.1 km || multiple || 2003–2020 || 15 Oct 2020 || 59 || align=left | Disc.: SpacewatchAdded on 17 January 2021 || 
|- id="2003 SV469" bgcolor=#E9E9E9
| 2 ||  || MBA-M || 17.9 || 1.1 km || multiple || 2003–2020 || 17 Nov 2020 || 35 || align=left | Disc.: LPL/Spacewatch IIAdded on 17 January 2021 || 
|- id="2003 SW469" bgcolor=#E9E9E9
| 1 ||  || MBA-M || 18.61 || data-sort-value="0.56" | 560 m || multiple || 2003–2021 || 07 Jan 2021 || 39 || align=left | Disc.: SpacewatchAdded on 17 January 2021 || 
|- id="2003 SX469" bgcolor=#E9E9E9
| 1 ||  || MBA-M || 17.5 || 1.3 km || multiple || 2003–2020 || 22 Nov 2020 || 50 || align=left | Disc.: SpacewatchAdded on 17 January 2021 || 
|- id="2003 SY469" bgcolor=#E9E9E9
| 0 ||  || MBA-M || 17.8 || data-sort-value="0.82" | 820 m || multiple || 2001–2021 || 06 Jan 2021 || 57 || align=left | Disc.: SpacewatchAdded on 17 January 2021 || 
|- id="2003 SB470" bgcolor=#fefefe
| 3 ||  || MBA-I || 20.1 || data-sort-value="0.28" | 280 m || multiple || 2003–2017 || 24 Oct 2017 || 19 || align=left | Disc.: SDSSAdded on 21 August 2021 || 
|- id="2003 SF470" bgcolor=#d6d6d6
| 1 ||  || MBA-O || 17.8 || 1.5 km || multiple || 2003–2020 || 19 Nov 2020 || 36 || align=left | Disc.: SpacewatchAdded on 17 January 2021 || 
|- id="2003 SG470" bgcolor=#E9E9E9
| 0 ||  || MBA-M || 18.2 || data-sort-value="0.96" | 960 m || multiple || 1999–2020 || 17 Oct 2020 || 52 || align=left | Disc.: SpacewatchAdded on 17 January 2021 || 
|- id="2003 SH470" bgcolor=#E9E9E9
| 1 ||  || MBA-M || 18.2 || data-sort-value="0.96" | 960 m || multiple || 2003–2021 || 16 Jan 2021 || 40 || align=left | Disc.: NEATAdded on 17 January 2021 || 
|- id="2003 SJ470" bgcolor=#E9E9E9
| 2 ||  || MBA-M || 18.7 || data-sort-value="0.76" | 760 m || multiple || 2003–2020 || 05 Dec 2020 || 28 || align=left | Disc.: SpacewatchAdded on 17 January 2021 || 
|- id="2003 SK470" bgcolor=#E9E9E9
| 2 ||  || MBA-M || 18.7 || data-sort-value="0.76" | 760 m || multiple || 2003–2020 || 08 Dec 2020 || 21 || align=left | Disc.: SpacewatchAdded on 17 January 2021 || 
|- id="2003 SL470" bgcolor=#FA8072
| 2 ||  || MCA || 19.4 || data-sort-value="0.55" | 550 m || multiple || 2003–2020 || 16 Dec 2020 || 38 || align=left | Disc.: NEATAdded on 17 January 2021 || 
|- id="2003 SM470" bgcolor=#E9E9E9
| 0 ||  || MBA-M || 17.7 || data-sort-value="0.86" | 860 m || multiple || 1995–2020 || 16 Dec 2020 || 48 || align=left | Disc.: SpacewatchAdded on 17 January 2021 || 
|- id="2003 SN470" bgcolor=#E9E9E9
| 0 ||  || MBA-M || 17.6 || data-sort-value="0.90" | 900 m || multiple || 2003–2021 || 13 Jan 2021 || 52 || align=left | Disc.: NEATAdded on 9 March 2021 || 
|- id="2003 SO470" bgcolor=#E9E9E9
| 0 ||  || MBA-M || 17.81 || 1.5 km || multiple || 2003–2021 || 28 Sep 2021 || 48 || align=left | Disc.: LPL/Spacewatch IIAdded on 9 March 2021 || 
|- id="2003 SP470" bgcolor=#E9E9E9
| 0 ||  || MBA-M || 17.3 || 1.5 km || multiple || 2003–2021 || 07 Feb 2021 || 54 || align=left | Disc.: SDSSAdded on 9 March 2021 || 
|- id="2003 SQ470" bgcolor=#d6d6d6
| 1 ||  || MBA-O || 16.9 || 2.3 km || multiple || 2003–2020 || 11 Nov 2020 || 30 || align=left | Disc.: LPL/Spacewatch IIAdded on 9 March 2021 || 
|- id="2003 SS470" bgcolor=#E9E9E9
| 2 ||  || MBA-M || 17.8 || data-sort-value="0.82" | 820 m || multiple || 2003–2019 || 01 Oct 2019 || 36 || align=left | Disc.: SpacewatchAdded on 9 March 2021 || 
|- id="2003 ST470" bgcolor=#fefefe
| 0 ||  || MBA-I || 19.29 || data-sort-value="0.41" | 410 m || multiple || 2003–2022 || 04 Jan 2022 || 31 || align=left | Disc.: SpacewatchAdded on 9 March 2021 || 
|- id="2003 SV470" bgcolor=#fefefe
| 0 ||  || HUN || 18.62 || data-sort-value="0.56" | 560 m || multiple || 2003–2021 || 14 Apr 2021 || 43 || align=left | Disc.: NEATAdded on 11 May 2021 || 
|- id="2003 SW470" bgcolor=#fefefe
| 2 ||  || MBA-I || 19.0 || data-sort-value="0.47" | 470 m || multiple || 2003–2020 || 19 Nov 2020 || 23 || align=left | Disc.: SpacewatchAdded on 11 May 2021 || 
|- id="2003 SX470" bgcolor=#fefefe
| 0 ||  || MBA-I || 18.6 || data-sort-value="0.57" | 570 m || multiple || 2003–2020 || 17 Dec 2020 || 40 || align=left | Disc.: SpacewatchAdded on 11 May 2021 || 
|- id="2003 SY470" bgcolor=#d6d6d6
| 0 ||  || MBA-O || 16.6 || 2.7 km || multiple || 2003–2020 || 16 Nov 2020 || 59 || align=left | Disc.: SpacewatchAdded on 11 May 2021Alt.: 2010 BY91 || 
|- id="2003 SZ470" bgcolor=#d6d6d6
| 0 ||  || MBA-O || 17.7 || 1.6 km || multiple || 2003–2020 || 10 Nov 2020 || 25 || align=left | Disc.: SDSSAdded on 11 May 2021 || 
|- id="2003 SA471" bgcolor=#fefefe
| 0 ||  || MBA-I || 17.9 || data-sort-value="0.78" | 780 m || multiple || 2003–2021 || 14 Apr 2021 || 38 || align=left | Disc.: SpacewatchAdded on 11 May 2021 || 
|- id="2003 SE471" bgcolor=#d6d6d6
| 0 ||  || MBA-O || 17.3 || 1.9 km || multiple || 2003–2019 || 31 Dec 2019 || 30 || align=left | Disc.: SpacewatchAdded on 17 June 2021 || 
|- id="2003 SG471" bgcolor=#fefefe
| 0 ||  || MBA-I || 19.11 || data-sort-value="0.45" | 450 m || multiple || 2003–2021 || 08 Sep 2021 || 35 || align=left | Disc.: SpacewatchAdded on 17 June 2021 || 
|- id="2003 SH471" bgcolor=#fefefe
| 0 ||  || MBA-I || 19.32 || data-sort-value="0.41" | 410 m || multiple || 2003–2021 || 07 Nov 2021 || 60 || align=left | Disc.: LPL/Spacewatch IIAdded on 17 June 2021 || 
|- id="2003 SJ471" bgcolor=#fefefe
| 2 ||  || MBA-I || 19.5 || data-sort-value="0.37" | 370 m || multiple || 2003–2017 || 27 Nov 2017 || 22 || align=left | Disc.: SpacewatchAdded on 17 June 2021 || 
|- id="2003 SK471" bgcolor=#fefefe
| 0 ||  || MBA-I || 18.65 || data-sort-value="0.55" | 550 m || multiple || 2003–2020 || 20 Apr 2020 || 45 || align=left | Disc.: SpacewatchAdded on 17 June 2021 || 
|- id="2003 SL471" bgcolor=#E9E9E9
| 0 ||  || MBA-M || 17.5 || 1.3 km || multiple || 2003–2018 || 20 Mar 2018 || 40 || align=left | Disc.: SpacewatchAdded on 17 June 2021 || 
|- id="2003 SM471" bgcolor=#E9E9E9
| 4 ||  || MBA-M || 19.1 || data-sort-value="0.45" | 450 m || multiple || 2003–2020 || 16 Dec 2020 || 18 || align=left | Disc.: SpacewatchAdded on 17 June 2021 || 
|- id="2003 SN471" bgcolor=#d6d6d6
| 0 ||  || MBA-O || 17.1 || 2.1 km || multiple || 2003–2021 || 10 May 2021 || 49 || align=left | Disc.: SpacewatchAdded on 17 June 2021 || 
|- id="2003 SO471" bgcolor=#fefefe
| 3 ||  || MBA-I || 19.0 || data-sort-value="0.47" | 470 m || multiple || 2003–2018 || 14 Aug 2018 || 17 || align=left | Disc.: SpacewatchAdded on 17 June 2021 || 
|- id="2003 SP471" bgcolor=#fefefe
| 4 ||  || MBA-I || 19.9 || data-sort-value="0.31" | 310 m || multiple || 2003–2013 || 24 Sep 2013 || 16 || align=left | Disc.: SpacewatchAdded on 21 August 2021 || 
|- id="2003 SQ471" bgcolor=#fefefe
| 1 ||  || MBA-I || 18.8 || data-sort-value="0.52" | 520 m || multiple || 2003–2021 || 07 Feb 2021 || 34 || align=left | Disc.: SpacewatchAdded on 21 August 2021 || 
|- id="2003 SR471" bgcolor=#d6d6d6
| 3 ||  || MBA-O || 18.1 || 1.3 km || multiple || 2003–2018 || 10 Dec 2018 || 26 || align=left | Disc.: SpacewatchAdded on 21 August 2021 || 
|- id="2003 SS471" bgcolor=#fefefe
| 0 ||  || MBA-I || 18.94 || data-sort-value="0.48" | 480 m || multiple || 2003–2021 || 10 Aug 2021 || 37 || align=left | Disc.: SDSSAdded on 21 August 2021 || 
|- id="2003 SY471" bgcolor=#fefefe
| 2 ||  || MBA-I || 18.4 || data-sort-value="0.62" | 620 m || multiple || 2003–2021 || 10 Jul 2021 || 21 || align=left | Disc.: SpacewatchAdded on 21 August 2021 || 
|- id="2003 SZ471" bgcolor=#fefefe
| 0 ||  || MBA-I || 18.70 || data-sort-value="0.54" | 540 m || multiple || 2003–2021 || 14 Nov 2021 || 66 || align=left | Disc.: SpacewatchAdded on 21 August 2021 || 
|- id="2003 SA472" bgcolor=#fefefe
| 2 ||  || MBA-I || 18.8 || data-sort-value="0.52" | 520 m || multiple || 2003–2020 || 21 Apr 2020 || 20 || align=left | Disc.: SpacewatchAdded on 21 August 2021 || 
|- id="2003 SB472" bgcolor=#E9E9E9
| 0 ||  || MBA-M || 17.75 || 1.6 km || multiple || 2003–2021 || 15 Aug 2021 || 28 || align=left | Disc.: SDSSAdded on 21 August 2021 || 
|- id="2003 SC472" bgcolor=#E9E9E9
| 0 ||  || MBA-M || 18.83 || data-sort-value="0.95" | 950 m || multiple || 2003–2021 || 26 Oct 2021 || 43 || align=left | Disc.: SpacewatchAdded on 21 August 2021 || 
|- id="2003 SD472" bgcolor=#E9E9E9
| 0 ||  || MBA-M || 18.4 || data-sort-value="0.88" | 880 m || multiple || 2003–2020 || 29 Jul 2020 || 23 || align=left | Disc.: Pan-STARRSAdded on 21 August 2021 || 
|- id="2003 SE472" bgcolor=#fefefe
| 0 ||  || MBA-I || 18.5 || data-sort-value="0.59" | 590 m || multiple || 2003–2021 || 13 Jan 2021 || 39 || align=left | Disc.: SpacewatchAdded on 21 August 2021 || 
|- id="2003 SF472" bgcolor=#fefefe
| 4 ||  || MBA-I || 19.1 || data-sort-value="0.45" | 450 m || multiple || 2003–2017 || 28 Oct 2017 || 29 || align=left | Disc.: SpacewatchAdded on 21 August 2021 || 
|- id="2003 SG472" bgcolor=#fefefe
| 2 ||  || MBA-I || 18.9 || data-sort-value="0.49" | 490 m || multiple || 2003–2017 || 21 Sep 2017 || 32 || align=left | Disc.: LPL/Spacewatch IIAdded on 21 August 2021 || 
|- id="2003 SH472" bgcolor=#d6d6d6
| 1 ||  || MBA-O || 17.8 || 1.5 km || multiple || 2003–2019 || 04 Sep 2019 || 28 || align=left | Disc.: SpacewatchAdded on 21 August 2021 || 
|- id="2003 SJ472" bgcolor=#E9E9E9
| 0 ||  || MBA-M || 18.59 || data-sort-value="0.80" | 800 m || multiple || 2003–2021 || 30 Nov 2021 || 27 || align=left | Disc.: SpacewatchAdded on 21 August 2021 || 
|- id="2003 SK472" bgcolor=#E9E9E9
| 0 ||  || MBA-M || 18.2 || data-sort-value="0.96" | 960 m || multiple || 2003–2020 || 28 Jun 2020 || 21 || align=left | Disc.: SDSSAdded on 21 August 2021 || 
|- id="2003 SL472" bgcolor=#E9E9E9
| 0 ||  || MBA-M || 17.9 || 1.5 km || multiple || 2003–2021 || 10 Aug 2021 || 21 || align=left | Disc.: SDSSAdded on 21 August 2021 || 
|- id="2003 SM472" bgcolor=#d6d6d6
| 1 ||  || MBA-O || 17.9 || 1.5 km || multiple || 2003–2019 || 29 Jul 2019 || 27 || align=left | Disc.: SpacewatchAdded on 21 August 2021 || 
|- id="2003 SN472" bgcolor=#fefefe
| 0 ||  || MBA-I || 18.18 || data-sort-value="0.69" | 690 m || multiple || 2002–2021 || 29 Oct 2021 || 149 || align=left | Disc.: NEATAdded on 21 August 2021Alt.: 2003 TA25 || 
|- id="2003 SO472" bgcolor=#fefefe
| 0 ||  || MBA-I || 18.7 || data-sort-value="0.54" | 540 m || multiple || 2003–2021 || 02 Oct 2021 || 55 || align=left | Disc.: SpacewatchAdded on 21 August 2021 || 
|- id="2003 SP472" bgcolor=#fefefe
| 0 ||  || MBA-I || 18.70 || data-sort-value="0.54" | 540 m || multiple || 2002–2021 || 28 Sep 2021 || 74 || align=left | Disc.: SpacewatchAdded on 21 August 2021 || 
|- id="2003 SQ472" bgcolor=#fefefe
| 0 ||  || MBA-I || 18.23 || data-sort-value="0.67" | 670 m || multiple || 2003–2021 || 03 Oct 2021 || 60 || align=left | Disc.: SpacewatchAdded on 21 August 2021 || 
|- id="2003 SR472" bgcolor=#d6d6d6
| 0 ||  || MBA-O || 17.20 || 2.0 km || multiple || 2003–2021 || 04 Jan 2021 || 45 || align=left | Disc.: LPL/Spacewatch IIAdded on 21 August 2021 || 
|- id="2003 SS472" bgcolor=#fefefe
| 0 ||  || MBA-I || 18.88 || data-sort-value="0.50" | 500 m || multiple || 2002–2021 || 29 Oct 2021 || 86 || align=left | Disc.: SpacewatchAdded on 30 September 2021 || 
|- id="2003 ST472" bgcolor=#E9E9E9
| 1 ||  || MBA-M || 17.6 || 1.7 km || multiple || 2003–2021 || 24 Sep 2021 || 46 || align=left | Disc.: SpacewatchAdded on 30 September 2021 || 
|- id="2003 SU472" bgcolor=#fefefe
| 0 ||  || MBA-I || 19.55 || data-sort-value="0.37" | 370 m || multiple || 2003–2021 || 28 Sep 2021 || 36 || align=left | Disc.: SpacewatchAdded on 30 September 2021 || 
|- id="2003 SO473" bgcolor=#E9E9E9
| 0 ||  || MBA-M || 17.38 || 1.4 km || multiple || 2003–2022 || 10 Jan 2022 || 74 || align=left | Disc.: SDSSAdded on 30 September 2021Alt.: 2003 UP425 || 
|- id="2003 SP473" bgcolor=#E9E9E9
| 1 ||  || MBA-M || 17.87 || 1.5 km || multiple || 2003–2021 || 09 Sep 2021 || 30 || align=left | Disc.: SpacewatchAdded on 30 September 2021 || 
|- id="2003 SQ473" bgcolor=#E9E9E9
| 0 ||  || MBA-M || 18.49 || 1.1 km || multiple || 2003–2021 || 27 Oct 2021 || 66 || align=left | Disc.: SpacewatchAdded on 30 September 2021 || 
|- id="2003 SR473" bgcolor=#fefefe
| 0 ||  || MBA-I || 19.28 || data-sort-value="0.41" | 410 m || multiple || 2003–2021 || 07 Nov 2021 || 52 || align=left | Disc.: SpacewatchAdded on 30 September 2021 || 
|- id="2003 SS473" bgcolor=#E9E9E9
| 1 ||  || MBA-M || 17.85 || 1.5 km || multiple || 2003–2021 || 03 Oct 2021 || 31 || align=left | Disc.: SpacewatchAdded on 30 September 2021 || 
|- id="2003 ST473" bgcolor=#E9E9E9
| 1 ||  || MBA-M || 18.79 || data-sort-value="0.97" | 970 m || multiple || 2003–2021 || 04 Oct 2021 || 29 || align=left | Disc.: SpacewatchAdded on 30 September 2021 || 
|- id="2003 SV473" bgcolor=#E9E9E9
| 0 ||  || MBA-M || 18.91 || data-sort-value="0.92" | 920 m || multiple || 2003–2021 || 24 Oct 2021 || 37 || align=left | Disc.: SpacewatchAdded on 30 September 2021 || 
|- id="2003 SX473" bgcolor=#fefefe
| 0 ||  || MBA-I || 18.7 || data-sort-value="0.54" | 540 m || multiple || 2003–2020 || 07 Oct 2020 || 43 || align=left | Disc.: SpacewatchAdded on 30 September 2021 || 
|- id="2003 SY473" bgcolor=#E9E9E9
| 1 ||  || MBA-M || 19.05 || data-sort-value="0.86" | 860 m || multiple || 2003–2021 || 06 Oct 2021 || 36 || align=left | Disc.: LPL/Spacewatch IIAdded on 30 September 2021 || 
|- id="2003 SZ473" bgcolor=#E9E9E9
| 0 ||  || MBA-M || 18.09 || 1.3 km || multiple || 2002–2021 || 06 Nov 2021 || 50 || align=left | Disc.: SpacewatchAdded on 30 September 2021 || 
|- id="2003 SA474" bgcolor=#FA8072
| 0 ||  || HUN || 19.22 || data-sort-value="0.43" | 430 m || multiple || 2003–2021 || 08 Nov 2021 || 72 || align=left | Disc.: SpacewatchAdded on 30 September 2021 || 
|- id="2003 SB474" bgcolor=#d6d6d6
| 0 ||  || MBA-O || 17.1 || 2.1 km || multiple || 2003–2020 || 10 Nov 2020 || 24 || align=left | Disc.: SpacewatchAdded on 5 November 2021 || 
|- id="2003 SC474" bgcolor=#E9E9E9
| 2 ||  || MBA-M || 18.3 || data-sort-value="0.92" | 920 m || multiple || 2003–2020 || 11 Dec 2020 || 26 || align=left | Disc.: SpacewatchAdded on 5 November 2021 || 
|- id="2003 SD474" bgcolor=#fefefe
| 0 ||  || MBA-I || 18.98 || data-sort-value="0.48" | 480 m || multiple || 2003–2021 || 06 Nov 2021 || 50 || align=left | Disc.: SpacewatchAdded on 5 November 2021 || 
|- id="2003 SE474" bgcolor=#fefefe
| 0 ||  || MBA-I || 19.03 || data-sort-value="0.46" | 460 m || multiple || 2003–2021 || 24 Oct 2021 || 36 || align=left | Disc.: SpacewatchAdded on 5 November 2021 || 
|- id="2003 SF474" bgcolor=#E9E9E9
| 0 ||  || MBA-M || 17.86 || 1.5 km || multiple || 2003–2021 || 06 Nov 2021 || 54 || align=left | Disc.: SDSSAdded on 5 November 2021 || 
|- id="2003 SG474" bgcolor=#E9E9E9
| 1 ||  || MBA-M || 18.67 || 1.0 km || multiple || 2003–2021 || 25 Nov 2021 || 39 || align=left | Disc.: SpacewatchAdded on 5 November 2021 || 
|- id="2003 SH474" bgcolor=#fefefe
| 0 ||  || MBA-I || 18.72 || data-sort-value="0.54" | 540 m || multiple || 2003–2021 || 27 Nov 2021 || 79 || align=left | Disc.: SpacewatchAdded on 5 November 2021 || 
|- id="2003 SK474" bgcolor=#fefefe
| 0 ||  || MBA-I || 18.64 || data-sort-value="0.56" | 560 m || multiple || 2003–2021 || 17 May 2021 || 170 || align=left | Disc.: SpacewatchAdded on 5 November 2021 || 
|- id="2003 SL474" bgcolor=#fefefe
| 2 ||  || HUN || 19.6 || data-sort-value="0.36" | 360 m || multiple || 2003–2021 || 15 Apr 2021 || 19 || align=left | Disc.: SpacewatchAdded on 5 November 2021 || 
|- id="2003 SM474" bgcolor=#fefefe
| 0 ||  || MBA-I || 18.99 || data-sort-value="0.47" | 470 m || multiple || 2003–2021 || 27 Dec 2021 || 54 || align=left | Disc.: SpacewatchAdded on 5 November 2021 || 
|- id="2003 SN474" bgcolor=#fefefe
| 0 ||  || MBA-I || 18.33 || data-sort-value="0.64" | 640 m || multiple || 2003–2021 || 15 Apr 2021 || 37 || align=left | Disc.: SpacewatchAdded on 5 November 2021 || 
|- id="2003 SO474" bgcolor=#E9E9E9
| 0 ||  || MBA-M || 17.7 || 1.6 km || multiple || 2003–2021 || 04 Oct 2021 || 32 || align=left | Disc.: SpacewatchAdded on 5 November 2021 || 
|- id="2003 SP474" bgcolor=#E9E9E9
| 0 ||  || MBA-M || 18.12 || 1.3 km || multiple || 2003–2021 || 08 Jul 2021 || 29 || align=left | Disc.: NEATAdded on 5 November 2021 || 
|- id="2003 SQ474" bgcolor=#E9E9E9
| 0 ||  || MBA-M || 17.42 || 1.8 km || multiple || 2003–2021 || 26 Nov 2021 || 40 || align=left | Disc.: SDSSAdded on 5 November 2021 || 
|- id="2003 SR474" bgcolor=#E9E9E9
| 1 ||  || MBA-M || 18.89 || data-sort-value="0.93" | 930 m || multiple || 2003–2021 || 28 Nov 2021 || 50 || align=left | Disc.: Spacewatch Added on 5 November 2021 || 
|- id="2003 SS474" bgcolor=#fefefe
| 0 ||  || MBA-I || 19.25 || data-sort-value="0.42" | 420 m || multiple || 2003–2021 || 30 Nov 2021 || 70 || align=left | Disc.: SpacewatchAdded on 24 December 2021 || 
|- id="2003 ST474" bgcolor=#fefefe
| 0 ||  || MBA-I || 19.00 || data-sort-value="0.47" | 470 m || multiple || 2002–2021 || 09 Nov 2021 || 47 || align=left | Disc.: SpacewatchAdded on 24 December 2021 || 
|- id="2003 SU474" bgcolor=#fefefe
| 0 ||  || MBA-I || 19.25 || data-sort-value="0.42" | 420 m || multiple || 2003–2021 || 30 Nov 2021 || 48 || align=left | Disc.: SpacewatchAdded on 24 December 2021 || 
|- id="2003 SV474" bgcolor=#fefefe
| 0 ||  || MBA-I || 18.87 || data-sort-value="0.50" | 500 m || multiple || 2003–2021 || 08 Dec 2021 || 48 || align=left | Disc.: SpacewatchAdded on 24 December 2021 || 
|- id="2003 SW474" bgcolor=#d6d6d6
| 0 ||  || MBA-O || 18.16 || 1.3 km || multiple || 2001–2019 || 24 Oct 2019 || 19 || align=left | Disc.: SpacewatchAdded on 24 December 2021 || 
|- id="2003 SX474" bgcolor=#fefefe
| 0 ||  || MBA-I || 18.52 || data-sort-value="0.59" | 590 m || multiple || 2003–2021 || 09 Dec 2021 || 69 || align=left | Disc.: SDSSAdded on 24 December 2021 || 
|- id="2003 SY474" bgcolor=#d6d6d6
| 3 ||  || MBA-O || 18.7 || 1.0 km || multiple || 2003–2019 || 23 Oct 2019 || 15 || align=left | Disc.: SDSSAdded on 24 December 2021 || 
|- id="2003 SZ474" bgcolor=#fefefe
| 0 ||  || MBA-I || 18.8 || data-sort-value="0.52" | 520 m || multiple || 2003–2021 || 09 Dec 2021 || 45 || align=left | Disc.: SpacewatchAdded on 24 December 2021 || 
|- id="2003 SB475" bgcolor=#E9E9E9
| 1 ||  || MBA-M || 18.5 || data-sort-value="0.59" | 590 m || multiple || 2003–2015 || 21 Aug 2015 || 19 || align=left | Disc.: SpacewatchAdded on 29 January 2022 || 
|- id="2003 SC475" bgcolor=#d6d6d6
| 2 ||  || MBA-O || 18.0 || 1.4 km || multiple || 2003–2019 || 25 Sep 2019 || 19 || align=left | Disc.: SpacewatchAdded on 29 January 2022 || 
|- id="2003 SD475" bgcolor=#E9E9E9
| 3 ||  || MBA-M || 18.5 || 1.1 km || multiple || 2003–2017 || 10 Nov 2017 || 17 || align=left | Disc.: SpacewatchAdded on 29 January 2022 || 
|- id="2003 SE475" bgcolor=#fefefe
| 1 ||  || MBA-I || 18.7 || data-sort-value="0.54" | 540 m || multiple || 2003–2016 || 08 Sep 2016 || 24 || align=left | Disc.: No observationsAdded on 29 January 2022 || 
|- id="2003 SF475" bgcolor=#E9E9E9
| 0 ||  || MBA-M || 17.9 || 1.1 km || multiple || 2003–2022 || 06 Jan 2022 || 51 || align=left | Disc.: No observationsAdded on 29 January 2022 || 
|}
back to top

References 
 

Lists of unnumbered minor planets